This is a comprehensive list of compositions by Erkki Melartin.

The works have been listed systematically. Within each group there are first works with opus number and then the works with an EM code. All the works with opus number have been published, if not specified otherwise. Most of the works with code EM are unpublished, and only the publishing information has been given. All information is based on the newest work catalog (December 2016). The work catalog is based on the archival material and manuscripts in several Finnish libraries and music archives (The National Library, The Library of Sibelius Academy, The library and archive of Sibelius Museum in Turku, the music library of The Finnish Broadcasting Company etc.). In addition, all the relevant printed music publications have been used during the compiling work.

Rough translations in English have been provided for the opus titles, but not for the original literal works, unless in Finnish only.

Operas 
 Aino (opera), Op. 50 (1907-1908) - Libretto Jalmari Finne  - Kalevala-mysterio kahdessa näytöksessä epilogineen solisteille, orkesterille and kanteleelle - A Kalevala mystery in two acts with an epilogue for soloists, orchestra and kantele
 Ainon aaria koivulle - Ainos aria till björken (Joel Rundt) - Ainos Arie an die Birke (Friedrich Ege) – Published for voice and piano

Other dramatic works 
 Prinsessa Ruusunen, Op. 22 (1904) - Prinsessan Törnosa - Prinzessin Dornröschen – Music to a musical fairy tale by (Zachris Topelius, in Finnish by Aatto Suppanen in 5 acts for soloists, choir and orchestra. – Published partly as arrangements for voice and piano and for solo piano. Two unpublished suites exist.
 1. Alkusoitto - Förspel - Vorspiel (piano arrangement published)
 2. Paimentanssi - Herdedans - Hirtentanz (piano arrangement published)
 12. Merimiesten laulu - Sjömanvisa - Der Seemann singt (arrangement for voice and piano published)
 13. Puutarhurin laulu - Trädgårdsmästarens visa - Der Gärtner singt (arrangement for voice and piano published)
 14. Kalastajien laulu - Der Fischer singt - Fiskarens sång (arrangement for voice and piano published)
 15. Tonttutanssi - Tomtedans - Gnomentanz (piano arrangement published)
 16. Menuetto - Menuet - Menuett (piano arrangement published)
 17. Perhosvalssi - Perhoisvalssi - Fjärilsvals - Schmetterlingswalzer - Butterfly waltz (piano arrangement published)
 18. Kuutamobaletti - Månskensbalett - Mondschein Ballet (piano arrangement published)
 19. Valssi - Vals - Valse (piano arrangement published)
 21. Kehruulaulu - Spinnvisa - Spinnerlied (piano arrangement published)
 22. Doriinan laulu - Dorinas sång - Dorine singt (arrangement for voice and piano published)
 30. Juhlamarssi - Festmarsch - Festival March - Häämarssi (arrangements for piano, salon orchestra, brass band and organ published)
 Hiiden miekka (Goblin's Sword), Op. 39 (1906) – Music to a play by Eino Leino. – Only partially published for voice and piano and for solo piano.
 Salome, Op. 41 (1905) – Music for choir and orchestra to a play by (Oscar Wilde, in Finnish by Jussi Snellman, mostly unpublished.
 Salomes dans - Salomen tanssi - Salome tantzt – published 1906 as piano arrangement
 Ikuinen taistelu (Eternal struggle), Op. 63 (1905-1910) – A mystery for soloists, reciter, choir and orchestra to a play by Johannes Linnankoski, unpublished) 
 Totuuden helmi (The pearl of truth), Op. 88 (1915)  – Music for a fairy tale play by Zachris Topelius in Finnish by Ester Ståhlberg (the prologue), Tyko Hagman, Valter Juva and Viljo Tarkiainen for soloists, choir and chamber orchestra – Published arranged for voice and piano and solo piano.
 Tähtisilmä (Starry eyed), Op. 124 (1924) – Music to a fairy tale play by Arvid Lydecken in three acts for soloists, choir and orchestra, mostly unpublished - Stjärnöga
 Laulan laulun linnullein – part 25 arranged for voice and piano and published
 Pan, Op. 161 (1929-1930) – Unpublished and unfinished music for a German film.
 Pohjolan häät (The wedding in Pohjola), Op. 179 (1902) – Unpublished music to a play by J. H. Erkko for soloists, chouir, string quartet, harp, kantele and brass.
 Balkanin kuningatar (The Queen of the Balkans), EM021 (1903) - Music to a play by Nikola I, Petrovitš Njegoš, unfinished sketches.
 Halleluja, EM059 (1901) – Music to a play by Bjørnstjerne Bjørnson for mixed choir and organ.
 Hannele, EM060 (1897-1901) - Music to a play by Gerhart Hauptmann, in Finnish by Jalmari Finne to mixed choir, piano, harmonium, organ and orchestra.
 Henrik IV (Henry IV), EM064 (1907) - Music to a play by William Shakespeare, in Finnish by Paavo Cajander for soloists and orchestra.
 Kevätaamun unelma (Un sogno d'una mattina primavera), EM110 (1905) – Music to a play by Gabriele D'Annunzio, in Finnish by Jalmari Hahl for orchestra.
 Valkoinen lootus (The White Lotus Flower), EM140 (1926) – Music to a play by Laura Soinne for soloists and an instrumental group.
 Meiram, EM156 (1897-1901) – Music to a play by (Eino Leino for soloist and orchestra.
 Orlanda kuningatar (Queen Orlanda), EM177 (1906) – Music to a play by Catulle Mendès in Finnish by Jalmari Hahl for female choir and chamber orchestra.
 Simo Hurtta, EM213 (1908) – Music to play by Eino Leino for a soloist and kantele.
 Sisar Beatrice (Soeur Beatrice), EM214 (1903) – Music to a play by Maurice Maeterlinck in Finnish by Jalmari Finne for orchestra.
 Syöjättären satu (Fairy tale by a Harpy), EM228 (1925) – Music to a play by Aura Jurva for orchester – only fragments exist.
 Ikuinen läheisyys (Eternal nearness), EM376 (1929?) – A play for radio, lost.
 Kandaules, EM404 (1916) – Music to a play by Jalmari Hahl, in Swedish by Bertel Gripenberg for choir and chamber orchestra. – Part 1 (Andante) has been published as a piano arrangement and titled Preludi in 1925 (Suomen Musiikkilehti).
 Lucrezia Borgia, EM440A (1907) – Music to a play by Victor Hugo, in Finnish by Juhani Aho for soloists and orchestra.

Ballets 
 Sininen helmi (The Blue Pearl), Op. 160 (1928-1930) – A ballet in three acts (40 parts) to the libretto by Erkki Melartin and Kaarlo Eronen for orchestra. Several unpublished suites are known, the only one published and recorded is from 2015 and by Jani Kyllönen and Hannu Lintu.
 Barcarolle - Venelaulu – Published in arrangement for two voices and piano in 1952, in Swedish by Joel Rundt

Solo songs 
For one voice and piano, if not specified otherwise.
 Två sånger (Two songs), Op. 3
 Marias vaggsång, Op. 3, No. 1 (1897) Oscar Levertin - Marian kehtolaulu (anonymous translation) – Arrangement for piano by Leo Funtek published 1926.
 Morgonsång, Op. 3, No. 2 (1898) The Bible. Canticles - Aamulaulu (teksti Korkeasta veisusta) - Arrangement for piano by Erkki Melartin published 1926.
 Nuorten lauluja I (Songs for the Youth I), Op. 4 (1897) - Eino Leino - De ungas sånger I
 Minä metsän polkuand kuljen (Along the paths in woodlands), Op. 4, No. 1 – Jag går längs skogens stigar
 Indiaani (Indian), Op. 4, No. 2 - Indianen
 Mirjamin laulu I (Mirjam's song), Op. 4, No. 3 - Mirjams sång I
 Mirjamin laulu II, Op. 4, No. 4 - Mirjams sång II
 Tre sanger (Three songs), Op. 13 (1898)
 O Herre Vilhelm Krag - Oi Herra (Ilta Koskimies) - O Vater, ich bin lebensmüd (anonymous) - O Father, give me (Anna Krook)
 Vandet risler...  (Johannes Jørgensen)
 Avsked after Heinrich Heine in Swedish probably by Erkki Melartin
 Fyra sånger med piano (Five sångs with piano), Op. 14
 Flickans klagan, Op. 14, No. 1 (1901) Johan Ludvig Runeberg - Die Klage eines Mädchens (Woldemar Kolpytschew)
 Skymning, Op. 14, No. 2 (1901) Alceste (Nino Runeberg)
 Vintermorgon, Op. 14, No. 3 (1901) Arvid Mörne
 Kväll på kyrkogården, Op. 14, No. 4 (1903 or earlier) Ignotus - Abend auf dem Kichhof (F. Tilgmann)
 Nuorten lauluja II (Songs for the Youth II), Op. 15 - De ungas sånger - Der Jugend Lieder
 Itkisit (A Tear) (1900) Larin-Kyösti - En tår (anonymous)
 Sirkan häämatka (Grasshopper's wedding) (1898) Eino Leino - Sländans bröllop (anonymous)
 Pellavan kitkijä (Weeding the flax) (1897) Otto Manninen - Linbråkerskan (anonymous)
 Kolme laulua (Three songs), Op. 17
 Omenankukat (Apple blossoms) (1902 or earlier) Eino Leino - Apelblom (Nino Runeberg)
 Pohjatuulen tuomiset (In winter storm) (1896) J. H. Erkko - I vinterstorm (Nino Runeberg)
 Nuku hetkinen (Sleep a while) (1897) Eino Leino - Sov ett ögonblick, tärna du unga (Nino Runeberg)
 Indisches Lied, Op. 19, No. 1 (1899) Percy Bysshe Shelley, anonymous translator - Indisk sång (anonymous) 
 La lune blanche, Op. 19, No. 2 (1906 or earlier) Paul Verlaine - Lied von Paul Verlaine (Hans Kirchner) - Sång af Paul Verlaine (anonymous)
 Rannalle nukkunut (Asleep onshore), Op. 19, No. 3 (1903 or earlier) Eino Leino - Han slumrade på stranden (anonymous)
 Kevätlaineet (Waves of spring), Op. 20, No. 1 (1902) Larin-Kyösti
 Päin kaunista kaukorantaa (Against the tempting opposite shote), Op. 20, No. 2 (1906 or earlier) Otto Manninen - Mot lockande fjärran stranden (Nino Runeberg)
 Sydänmaan lammella (On a backwoods pond), Op. 20, No. 3 (1897) Ilmari Kianto as Ilmari Calamnius – Arrangement for piano published 1920, for pump organ by Oskar Merikanto in 1924.
 Nya sånger (New songs), Op. 21 - Uusia lauluja
 Längtan heter min arvedel (1903) Erik Aksel Karlfelt
 I skäraste morgongryning (1895) Karl August Tavaststjerna
 Pohjan neidon ylistys (Praise of the Maiden of Pohjola) (1902) J. H. Erkko
 Ritorno, Op. 24, No. 1 (1905) Annie Vivanti - Paluu (anonymous) - Hemkomst (Nino Runeberg)
 Recordare, Op. 24, No. 2 (1906) liturgical text - Rukous (Jussi Snellman) - Bön (Nino Runeberg)
 Serenatella napolitana, Op. 24, No. 3 (1906 or earlier) traditional Italian song
 Maggiolata, Op. 24, No. 4 (1906 or earlier) Giosuè Carducci - Kevätlaulu (anomymous)
 Jeg beder er, Op. 26, No. 1 (1906) Herman Bang - Ich bitte euch (Woldemar Kolpytschew)
 Höst, Op. 26, No. 2 (1906 or earlier) Ignotus - Herbst (Woldemar Kolpytschew)
 Melodi, Op. 26, No. 3 (1906 or earlier) Anna Maria Roos - Melodie (Woldemar Kolpytschew)
 En visa till Karin när hon dansat, Op. 29, No. 1 (1897-1906) Gustaf Fröding - Ein Lied an Karin, als sie tanzte (Woldemar Kolpytschew)
 En visa till Karin ur fängelset, Op. 29, No. 2 (1906?) Gustaf Fröding
 Rosa romans bonitatem, Op. 32, No. 1 (1906) Birger Mörner - O, Madonna, beug' dich nieder (Waldemar Kolpytschew)
 Die heil'gen drei Könge, Op. 32, No. 2 (1906 or earlier) Heinrich Heine
 Onneni saari (My island of bliss), Op. 32, No. 3 (1914) Jussi Snellman - Min lyckoö (Joel Rundt)
 Lumpeenkukka (Water lily flower), Op. 37, No. 1 (1906) Heikki Rytkönen - Näckrosen (anonymous)
 Ikävyys (Dullness), Op. 37, No. 2 (1907) Aleksis Kivi
 Päivä koittaa, Op. 37, No. 3 (1907) A. Oksanen or August Ahlqvist - Dagen bräcker (Rafael Lindqvist)
 Illan varjot (Shadows of the night), Op. 37, No. 4 (1909 or earlier) Jussi Snellman
 Drick, Op. 38, No. 1 (1906) Bertel Gripenberg - Trink (Woldemar Kolpytschew)
 Den svarta fjäriln, Op. 38, No. 2 (1907) Oscar Levertin - Der schwarze Falter (Woldemar Kolpytschew)
 Vallarelåt, Op. 42, No. 1 (1906) Gustaf Fröding
 Christkindleins Wiegenlied, Op. 42, No. 2 (1906) Des Knaben Wunderhorn - Kristuslapsen kehtolaulu (Aune Krohn) – Kristusbarnets vaggsång (anonymous) - Kristbarnets vaggsång - A Christmas Cradle Song (Rosa Newmarch) – Arrangement for piano published 1925
 Vom Rosenquell, Op. 42, No. 3 (1906 or earlier) Hermann Ubell - Rosenundret (anonymous) - Ruusulähteellä (anonymous)
 Mutterfreude, Op. 42, No. 4 (1898) Sappho - Modersfröjd (anonymous) - Äidinilo (anonymous)
 Der Tod, das ist die kühle Nacht, Op. 42, No. 5 (1906) Heinrich Heine - On kuolo viileen kylmä yö (Jussi Snellman) - O död, du är den svala natt (anonymous)
 Klarer Himmel, Op. 42, No. 6 (1900?) original text Paul Verlaine, translation Carl Bulcke - Kirkas taivas (Jussi Snellman) - Klar himmel (anonymous)
 Am Tag freut uns die Sonne... , Op. 42, No. 7 (1907 or earlier) Otto Julius Bierbaum - Kun koittaa päivä kulta...  (Jussi Snellman) - Skön är om dagen solen...  (anonymous)
 Lauluja V. A. Koskenniemen runoihin I (Songs to the words by V. A. Koskenniemi), Op. 45 (1907-1920) Veikko Antero Koskenniemi, translations into German Johann Jakob Meyer – Leo Funtek has arranged the songs for voice and orchestra (unpublished)
 Syyslaulu (Autumn song), Op. 45, No. 1 (1909?) - Herbstlied
 Ma vierahassa kaupungissa käyn (I walk through a strange town), Op. 45, No. 2 (1912 or earlier) - Ich gehe eine fremde Stadt entlang
 Keskiyön kaupunki (The city at midnight), Op. 45, No. 3 (1913) - Die Stadt um Mitternacht
 Chrysanthemum, Op. 45, No. 4 (1913) 
 Siell' on kauan jo kukkineet omenapuut (The apple trees already a long time in flower), Op. 45, No. 5 (1909) - Dort erblühte schon lange der Apfelbaum
 Kevätvaloa (Springtime light), Op. 45, No. 6 (1907-1911) - Frühlingslicht
 Yli vaikenevain kattoin (Over the silent roofs), Op. 45, No. 7 (1908) - Auf die Dächer
 Nää, oi mun sieluni, auringon korkea nousu! (Look, my soul, the sunrise), op45, No. 9 (1919) - Schau, meine Seele, der Sonne erhabenen Aufgang!
 Lauluja V. A. Koskenniemen runoihin II, (Songs to the words by V. A. Koskenniemi) Op. 46 (1907-1908) – Lakeus (The plains) - Die Ebene (Veikko Antero Koskenniemi, translations into German Johann Jakob Meyer – Leo Funtek has arranged the songs nos 2-8 for voice and orchestra (unpublished)
 Mun sieluni sun ylläs väräjää (My soul is quivering), Op. 46, No. 1 - Es zittert meine Seele über dir
 Sun rauhaas lemmin (I love your tranquility), Op. 46, No. 2 - Wie sonst nicht anderes lieb' ich deinen Frieden
 Yön ihmeelliseen valoon (Into the marvelous light of the night), Op. 46, No. 3 - Ins wunderbare Licht der Nacht
 Ikävässä kenttäin huojuvaisten (So tedious the spikes wobble), Op. 46, No. 4 - In der felder monotonem Schwanken
 Nyt öin jo yli kenttäin hämärtäy (Now the night is falling over the fields), Op. 46, No. 5 - Nun liegt die Flur auch Nachts im Dämmerlicht
 Päivän viime säteet (The last beams of the day), Op. 46, No. 6 - Letzter Sonnenstrahl
 Nocturne, Op. 46, No. 7 - Still die Vögel all auf ihren Zweigen
 Kesäyö kirkkomaalla (Summer night on a churchyard), Op. 46, No. 9 - Sommernacht auf einem Friedhof
 Lauluja V. A. Koskenniemen runoihin III (Songs to the words by V. A. Koskenniemi), Op. 47 (1907-1920) Veikko Antero Koskenniemi, translations into German Johann Jakob Meyer – Leo Funtek has arranged the songs for voice and orchestra (unpublished)
 Tule armaani and kätes anna mulle! (Come my love and stretch our your hand), Op. 47, No. 1 (1908) - Kom min kära, räck mig dina händer (Joel Rundt) - Komme Liebchen mein, und reiche mir die Hände!
 Katulyhty (Street lantern), Op. 47, No. 2 (1912?) - Die Strassenlaterne
 Syyssonetti (Autumnal sonnet), Op. 47, No. 3 (1919?) - Herbstsonett
 Kevätlaulu (Spring song), Op. 47, No. 4 (1918) - Lenzlied
 Pan, Op. 47, No. 5 (1920?) - O weh dem Wanderer im Waldesmoor
 Vanha Faun (Old Faun), Op. 47, No. 6 (1919) - Der alte Faun
 Nuori Psyyke (Young Psyche), Op. 47, No. 7 (1912?) - Die junge Psyche
 Fiat nox, Op. 47, No. 9 (1911) - So sinke Nacht
 Lastenlauluja I (Children's songs), Op. 49b (1907 or earlier) - Barnvisor I - Kinderlieder I
 Ratsulaulu (Knight song) (1906) Julius Krohn - Till mormor vi rida (anonymous)
 Das Maienglöckchen Adolf Schults - Kielon kellot (anonymous) - Konvaljen (Jussi Snellman)
 Der kleine Gernegross Traditional German text - Aimo aikamies (anonymous) - Store lillepytt (Jussi Snellman)
 Der Winter Matthias Claudius - Talvi (anonymous) - Vintern (Jussi Snellman)
 Frühlings Ankunft Des Knaben Wunderhorn - Kevätlaulu (anonymous) - Våren kommit (Jussi Snellman)
 Linnunpesä Georg Christian Dieffenbach, in Finnish by Jussi Snellman - Das Vogelnest - Fågelboet (Jussi Snellman)
 Kansanlauluja Käkisalmelta (Folk songs from Käkisalmi), Op. 55a (1908) - Volkslieder aus Kexholm  - Arrangements for piano with the words. Opuses 55a-c were later published in one volume with the title 112 kansanlaulua Käkisalmelta. No attempt has been made to translate the original titles.
 1. Tule, tule! , 2. Pappani pellolla. 3. Yöllä, 4. Tytöt yksin, 5. Iso ilo, 6. Tallaralla, 7. Koivumetsässä, 8. Erotessa, 9. Kodista vieroitettu, 10. Voi, voi, voi, 11. Harmiaveden ranta, 12. Voi niitä aikoja, 13. Mene pois! , 14. Tytöt, 15. Illalla (Tula tullalla, posket pullalla), 16. Soutelin, soutelin, 17. Merellä, 18. Ähä, ähä!, 19. Kun etelästä tuulee, 20. Tän kylän ämmät, 21. Vienonlainen veto, 22. Hulivilipoika, 23. Vanha tanssi, 24. Lammin rannalla, 25. Kaurapellon pientarella, 26. Kuinka se joki taisi suora olla - Älven - Flusswindung (Elisabeth Kurkiala), 27. Surressa, 28. Hoilotus, 29. Joki, 30. Älä, tyttö, katsele, 31. Köyhä tyttö, 32. Niinkuin ne pienet lintuset, 33. Keskeltä Ostamo lainehtii, 34. Rimputa, ramputa, 35. Meinasin, meinasin, 36. Kaakkuri, 37. Turun linnan vanha kirkko, 38. Heilani (Joen takana on punanen talo) - Vännen min - Mein Liebchen (Elisabeth Kurkiala), 39. Mansikka on punanen marja, 40. Vuorolaulu (And tytöt meni niitylle sun saalialla niitylle).
 Piirilauluja Käkisalmelta (Circuit songs from Käkisalmi), Op. 55b (1908) - Volkslieder aus Kexholm II - No attempt has been made to translate the original titles.
 1. Se kunnia, 2. Lintu se lauloi, 3. Raita, 4. Sano, sano, 5. Kultani, 6. Sempä tähden, 7. Pappa se sanoi, 8. Tilu-lilu-lei, 9. Köyhä poika, 10. Yhdessä, 11. Onneni, 12. Vanha tanssi, 13. Heila Hampurissa, 14. Tule, tule, 15. Metsässä, 16. Nytpä nähdään, 17. Tään kylän tytöt, 18. Kylä, 19. Piirissä, 20. Lemmenkukkia, 21. Juu jaa and rallallei, 22. Naapurin likka, 23. Juomaripoika, 24. Minä sinua, sinä minua, 25. Rekilaulu (Musta lintu merikotka ylähällä lentää), 26. Kahvia, 27. Mamman sinisilmä, 28. Voi teitä, 29. Vankilaan mennessä, 30. Varis, 31. Ostamon järven rannalla, 32. Kesällä ei passaa, 33. Isäntä, emäntä, renki, 34. Tallella, 35. Kotimatkalla, 36. Tämä piiri, 37. Kesäillalla, 38. Laulu kullalle, 39. Älä unhoita minua, 40. Hohhoh-hohhoh.
 Kansanlauluja Käkisalmelta (Folk songs from Käkisalmi), Op. 55c (sovitettu 1908) - Volkslieder aus Kexholm III - No attempt has been made to translate the original titles.
 1. Hieno and hoikka, 2. Sillä lailla, tällä lailla, 3. Heilani kotiin, 4. Hyvä on laulella, 5. Varasleikki, 6. Hoilotus, 7. Jaakkarikello, 8. Ystäväni rakas, 9. Vierivän virran reunalla, 10. Salainen rakkaus, 11. Ei saa moittia, 12. Hyvää iltaa, 13. Iltalaulu (Voi kuin kauniin ruusun kukan eilen illalla löysin), 14. Kettu, 15. Sureva, 16. Pojat ne loikki, 17. Juomari, 18. Tanssi nyt!, 19. Väki tuli saaresta, 20. Viheriäisen niityn poikki, 21. Amalian aitta, 22. Sinun silmäs and minun silmät, 23. Kanon (Lemmen lämmöstä syttynyt on tuo mustikkainen suru), 24. Kananmuna, 25. Heilistä jäänyt, 26. Jos mie saisin, 27. Köyhistä vanhemmista, 28. Oman kylän poikien laulu, 29. Viheriäinen maa, 30. Rallati koputin, 31. Kulta, 32. Piiritanssi.
 Onnettomasti syntynyt, Op. 58, No. 1 (1909 or earlier) Kanteletar - Olycks barn (anonymous) - Das Unglückskind (Woldemar Kolpytschew) – Opus 58 bears a collective title Uusia lauluja vanhoihin sanoihin - Nya visor till gamla ord in some manuscripts, but all songs were published separately.
 An der Himmelstür, Op. 58, No. 2 (1909) Traditional text - Taivaan portilla (anonymous) - Vid himlaporten (anonymous)
 An Hesperos, Op. 58, No. 3 (1909) Bion of Smyrna, translation is anonymous
 Povertade, Op. 58, No. 4 (1909) Jacopone da Todi – Voice and piano or organ
 Hvem är du, o Tärna! , Op. 58, No. 5 (1909) Johan Olof Wallin
 L'automne, Op. 58, No. 6 (1909) Alphonse de Lamartine
 Cradle song, Op. 65 (1910) William Blake – Voice and string quartet
 Fem Sange (Five songs), Op. 69 (1910) - Fünf Lieder
 Kys mig på øjnene sol! Ludvig Holstein - Küss mir die Augen Sonne!  (anonymous)
 Kys mig Thor Lange - Küss mich!  (anonymous)
 Hvorfor? Thor Lange - Warum?  (anonymous)
 Arkturus (Johannes Jørgensen) - Es blinket ein Sternlein einsam (anonymous)
 Tungsind O. Elholm - Schwermut (anonymous)
 Trois chansons avec piano (Three songs with piano), Op. 71 - Sånger 
 Et s'il revenait un jour (1913) Maurice Maeterlinck - Om han återvände hem (Nino Runeberg)
 Angoisse (1915) Olly Donner - Ångest (Nino Runeberg) - Tuska (Meri Louhos)
 Chi sa...  (1913) Annie Vivanti - Hvem vet?  (anonymous)
 Gieb mir dein Herze, Op. 73, No. 1 (1910-1912?) Anonymous text of 1650 - Suo mulle syömmes, silloin syömmein sun ois Martti Korpilahti - Anna syömmes mulle (Wäinö Sola) - Giv mig ditt hjärta (Joel Rundt)
 Hyvää yötä (Good night), Op. 73, No. 2 (1912) L. Onerva, 1912) - Gute Nacht (Johannes Öhquist)
 Mot alla stjärnor, Op. 73, No. 3 (1912) Vilhelm Ekelund - Sternennacht (Johannes Öhquist)
 Kristallikukkia (Crystal flowers), Op. 73, No. 4 (Larin-Kyösti, 1912) - Kristallblumen (Johannes Öhquist)
 Lieder (Songs), Op. 77
 Traum (1908) Otto Julius Bierbaum
 Det är juni (1911) Vilhelm Ekelund - Es ist Juni (anonymous)
 Son gelosa di te (1904) Ada Negri - Eifersucht (anonymous)
 Från lägerbålet i öknen, Op. 78, No. 1 (1911) Verner von Heidenstam - Erämaan leiriltä (Jussi Snellman) - From desert camp fires (Angela Campbell McInnes) - Lien fragile (Gérard Jean-Aubry)
 Ro, Op. 78, No. 2 (1912 or earlier) Vilhelm Ekelund - Rauha (Jussi Snellman) - Peace (Angela Campbell McInnes) - Apaisement (Gérard Jean-Aubry)
 Från andra sidan Styx, Op. 78, No. 3 (1901) Karl August Tavaststjerna - Styx virralta (Jussi Snellman)
 Tre sange (Three songs), Op. 86 (1914)
 Aftensang (Erik Moltesen)
 Den forladte (Erik Moltesen)
 Under häggarna (Jarl Hemmer)
 Hjärtstilla, Op. 89a (1911) Erik Axel Karlfeldt - Yönkukka (Jussi Snellman)
 Solsang, Op. 89b (1918) Helge Rode - Solsång (anonymous) - Aurinkolaulu (Johannes Linnankoski)
 Fire Sange (Four songs), Op. 95 - Vier Lieder - Fyra sånger
 En melodi (1904) Valdemar Rørdam
 Der König im Kerker (1914) Richard Schaukal - Bass and piano
 Sister, awake! (1912?) Anonymous text of 1604 - Vakna min syster! (Anna Krook)
 Som på blånande fjärdar (1914-1916) Jarl Hemmer
 Sånger till ord af Jarl Hemmer, Op. 96 (1915-1916?) Jarl Hemmer
 Elegie
 Akvarell
 Vårmorgon - Kevätaamu (Pekka Sipilä)
 Fem nya sånger (Five new songs), Op. 97 (1916-1917) - Viisi uutta laulua (all translation into Finnish by Jussi Snellman)
 Den långa dagen Johan Ludvig Runeberg - Pitkä päivä
 Till Helmi Josef Julius Wecksell - Helmille
 Mademoiselle Rococo Mikael Lybeck - Mademoiselle Rokoko
 November (Poul Andersen) - Marraskuu
 Vem styrde hit din väg? (Johan Ludvig Runeberg) - Ken tiesi tänne toi? 
 Kuutamo (Moonlight), Op. 99, No. 1 (1915) Otto Manninen - I månestrålars sken (Nino Runeberg)
 Kuu kalpea (The pale moon), Op. 99, No. 2 (1913-1916) Eino Leino - Den bleka månen (Rafael Lindqvist)
 Oi suljehan silmäsi (Oh, close your eyes), Op. 99, No. 3 (1899) Eino Leino - O slut dina ögon (anonymous)
 Oravan jäljillä (On the trail of a squirrel), Op. 99, No. 4 (1911 or earlier) Larin-Kyösti - I ekorrns spår (Nino Runeberg)
 Poluilla harmajilla (On the grey paths), Op. 99, No. 5 (1900?) Pontus Artti, unpublished
 Satakielelle (To the nightingale), Op. 99, No. 6 (1918?) Veikko Antero Koskenniemi - Till en näktergal (Rafael Lindqvist)
 Fyra Tagore-sånger (Four Tagore songs), Op. 105 (1914-1918) Rabindranath Tagore - Fyra sånger till text av Tagore – Voice, piano and violin ad. lib.
 Skyar (Nino Runeberg) - Wolken (Marie-Luise Gothein) - Clouds (Rabindranath Tagore)
 Sagan om vårt hjärta (anonymous) - Das Märchen uns'rer Liebe (Maria Beaurain) - Record of our hearts  (Rabindranath Tagore)
 Smärtan (anonymous) - Der Schmerz (Maria Beaurain) - I plucked your flower (Rabindranath Tagore)
 Sinä päivänä (Helmi Krohn) - Allvarsdagen (Nino Runeberg) - Der ernste Tag (Maria Beaurain) - On the day (Rabindranath Tagore)
 Sånghälsning, Op. 106, No. 1 (1917) Georg Mellin - Soios soitto (Jussi Snellman) - Voice, piano and violin ad. lib.
 Wiegenlied bei Mondschein zu singen, Op. 106, No. 2 (1918) Matthias Claudius - Vaggvisa i månskenet (Nino Runeberg) - Voice, piano and violin ad. lib.
 Liedchen, Op. 106, No. 3 (1920) Oskar von Redwitz - En visa (Nino Runeberg) - Laulelma Amaranthista (Jussi Snellman)
 Hymn, Op. 106, No. 4 (1920) Selma Kajanus - Hymn till vänskapen - Ystävyyden ylistys (Jussi Snellman) - Voice, piano or harp
 Schlummerliedchen, Op. 106, No. 5 (1920) Emanuel von Bodman - Slummervisa (Rafael Lindqvist) - Sorsat ne rantojen kaisloissa uivat (anonymous)
 6 Sange (Six songs), Op. 107 - Sex sånger
 Al denne sorte himmel (1897/1918) Vilhelm Krag - Fred (anonymous) – Mezzo-soprano and piano
 Den lyse Nat (1919) Hans Hartvig Seedorff
 Pääskyselle (To the swallow) (1910) Jooseppi Mustakallio - Til Svalen (Hans Hartvig Seedorff)
 Vinternat (1919) Peter Andreas Rosenberg
 Ak, du birketræ (1920) Thor Lange
 Intet kan dø (1919) Thorkil Barfod
 Det första regnet, Op. 109, No. 1 (1919 or earlier) Svea Hällström - Keväinen sade (Jussi Snellman)
 Solen sjunkit, Op. 109, No. 2 (1916) Jacob Tegengren - Päivä sammui (Jussi Snellman)
 Falder dig Vandringen tung, Op. 109, No. 3 (1919 or earlier) Gunnar Gunnarsson - Työläs kulkus jos tuo (Jussi Snellman)
 Det er i Dag et Vejr, Op. 109, No. 4 (1919 or earlier) Ludvig Holstein - On päivä kirkas (Jussi Snellman)
 Stimme im Dunkeln, Op. 109, No. 5 (1906) Richard Dehmel - Röster i dunklet (Rafael Lindqvist)
 Die heiligen drei Könige der Elenos, Op. 109, No. 6 (1899?) Otto Julius Bierbaum, unpublished
 Keinutan kaikua (Swaying the echo), Op. 115, No. 1 (1904) L. Onerva  - Varligt jag vaggar dig (Joel Rundt)
 Toivoni (My hope), Op. 115, No. 2 (1904) Paavo Cajander
 Sie singt, Op. 115, No. 3 (1900) Emanuel von Bodman
 Du blühst wie die Julirosen, Op. 115, No. 4 (1907) Maximilian Danthendey - Du blommar som julirosen (Rafael Lindqvist) - unpublished
 Bergerette, Op. 115, No. 5 (1917) Elin Golovin - A mon aiglon - Till min örnunge - Den lilla härdinnan / Den lilla herdinnan (Rafael Lindqvist)
 Vandringer, Op. 116, No. 1 (1918) Laurits Christian Nielsen
 Sommersang, Op. 116, No. 2 (1919 or earlier) Erik Moltesen
 Liebeslied, Op. 116, No. 3 (1895 /1918) Ewhadaddin Enweri, translation to German by Anton Eduard Wollheim - Persische Lieder
 Spielmannslied, Op. 116, No. 4 (1919) Des Knaben Wunderhorn - Spelmansvisa (Nino Runeberg)
 Stum kärlek, Op. 116, No. 5 (1919) Johan Ludvig Runeberg - Stumme Liebe (Friedrich Hermann Schneider)
 Mitt hjärta behöver, Op. 116, No. 6 (1919) Jarl Hemmer - Mein Herze ersehnt sich (Friedrich Hermann Schneider)
 Sånger vid piano (Songs with piano), Op. 117 (1921) – all translations by Jussi Snellman
 I natt skall jag dö Harriet Löwenhjelm - Viimeinen yö
 Skåda, skåda hur det våras Harriet Löwenhjelm - Katso, kuinka kevään saamme
 Til et barn Herman Wildenwey - Lapselle
 Fågeln i päronträd Traditional Swedish text - Istut, lintunen oksallas
 Höstackord, Op. 122, No. 1 (1924) Prince Wilhelm, Duke of Södermanland, unpublished
Opus 122, No. 2 has been never used
 Luonnon yö, Op. 122, No. 3 (1923) J. H. Erkko, unpublished - Naturens natt (anonymous)
 So bin ich nur als Kind erwacht, Op. 122, No. 4 (1923-1924) Rainer Maria Rilke, unpublished
Opus 122, No. 5 has been never used
 Bön om ro, Op. 122, No. 6 (1924) Jarl Hemmer - Rauhan rukous (Ilta Koskimies)
 En liten visa, Op. 122, No. 7 (1928 or earlier) Jussi Snellman - En liten minnesvisa
 Jul, Op. 122, No. 9 (1927?) Jacob Tegengren - Hyvyyden voiman ihmeellisen suojaan (Anna-Maiand Raittila) – The melody has been used with at least five Swedish choral texts: Att bedand är ej endast att begära - Frälsare du som äger läkedomen - När du är trött - Se, kärlet brast, och oljan är utgjuten - Tänk när en gång det töcken har försvunnit.
 Kolme laulua (Three songs), Op. 128
 Tili tili tengan löysin (1928) A. O. Väisänen
 Sykön virsi (1925 or earlier) Eino Leino
 Merimiehen iltalaulu (1920?) Veikko Antero Koskenniemi
 Uusia kansanlauluja (New folk songs), Op. 130 (1925) Traditional texs, translations by Joel Rundt - Nya folkvisor - 7 uutta kansanlaulua - No attempt has been made to translate the original titles.
 Kaipaava - Den längtande
 Heilini soitteli (Talvella Talikkalan markkinoilla) - Minns du på marknadsdansen i staden
 Sinun silmäs and minun silmät - Dina ögon och mina ögon
 Aikoand entisiä - Gångna tider
 Vierivän virran reunalla - Vid den glidande flodens strand
 Linnassa - I fästningen
 Hyvästijättö - Farväl
 Nuorten laulukirja I (Song book of the youth I), Op. 131 (1925?) – Songs to one, two and three voices with piano (also a version with only one voice published 1929)
 Taas koulun ukset aukeaa (The school begins) (Immi Hellén)
 Lumisilla (Snowball fight) (anonymous)
 Meidän mummo (Our grandma) (Alli Nissinen)
 Lintujen syyslaulu (Autumn song of the birds) (Immi Hellén)
 Lauvantai-ilta (Saturday night) (traditional text)
 Isä pellollaan (Father on the field) (Immi Hellén)
 Kevät kutoo (Spring is coming) (anonymous)
 Keväällä (In the spring time) (pseudonym T.S.)
 Nukkien karkelot (The puppets are dancing) (Alli Nissinen) - Nukkien tanssit
 Mirrit koulussa (Kitties in school) (anonymous)
 Kesän tullessa (The summer is coming) (Yrjö Veijola)
 Leivo (Skylark) (Aleksanteri Rahkonen)
 Seimen lapsi (Child in the manger) (anonymous)
 Jouluaamu (Christmas morning) (Immi Hellén)
 Jouluilta salomailla (Christmas evening in the backwoods) (Arvily)
 Lapin tunturilla (Mountain of Lapland) (anonymous)
 Puurolaulu (Porridge song) (anonymous)
 Joulu armas muistuu mieleen (I still remember the sweet Christmas time) (pseudonym "-a -a")
 Kiitos (Thank you) (Simo Korpela) – Voice and organ or piano
 Työtä aljettaessa (When the work is beginning) (A. Oksanen)
 Kiitosvirsi (Hymn of thank)  (Simo Korpela)
 Hiljaisuutta anna (Give me some silence) (pseudonym L.S.)
 Helluntaivirsi (Johan Ludvig Runeberg in Finnish by Alpo Noponen)
 Totuuden henki (Spirit of the truth) (Zachris Topelius in Finnish by V. Vesala) - Totuuden henki, haasta korkealta (Alpo Noponen, 1927)
 Paddan, Op. 132 (1926) Johan Henric Kellgren - Sammakko (Kyllikki Solanterä)
 Nuorten laulukirja II (Song book of the youth II), Op. 134a (1927 or earlier) – Songs to one, two and three voices with piano (also a version with only one voice published 1929)
 Hyvä paimen (The good shepherd) (Immi Hellén)
 Linnun hautaus (Bird's burial) (Alpo Noponen)
 Rattoisa retki (A merry moment) (Immi Hellén)
 Suvinen sade (Rain in summer) (Alpo Noponen)
 Tuuti (Sleep) (Alli Nissinen)
 Virsi kotimaan puolesta (Hymn for our homeland) (Suonio) 
 Kodin kynnys (Doorstep at home) (Arvily)
 Kyläkoulu (Village school) (Arvily)
 Autan ensin (I help in the first place) (Arvily)
 Heikin ystävät (Friends of Heikki) (Arvily)
 Iltalaulu (Evening song) (Arvily)
 Ratsu reipas odottaa (A brisk steed is waiting) (Arvily)
 Suvella (In the summer time) (Jussi Snellman)
 Pikku Maiand nurmikolla (Little Maiand on the lawn) (Immi Hellén)
 Unten siipisisko (Gentle sister of sleep) (Arvily)
 Mirriäidin lapset (Puppies of the mother cat) (Immi Hellén)
 Karhujen tanssi (Dance of the bears) (pseudonym "-n")
 Niityllä (On the fields) (Ilmari Kianto)
 Lasten joululaulu (Children sing for Christmas) (Larin-Kyösti)
 Lumisateella (It's snowing) (Suonio)
 Rukous (A pray) (Alli Nissinen)
 Talvi-iltahämärässä (Twilight of the winter evening) (Larin-Kyösti)
 Oi kuin selvään soipi meille (So clearly it chimes) (Immi Hellén)
 Te soikaa joulun kellot taas (Toll you bells of Christmas)  (Aukusti Simelius)
 Nuorten laulukirja III (Song book of the youth III), Op. 134b (1928 or earlier) – Songs to one, two and three voices with piano (also a version with only one voice published 1928)
 Luistimilla (Skating) (Otto Manninen)
 Kultasauva (Golden rod) (Otto Manninen)
 Toivoni (My hope) (Paavo Cajander)
 Mökkiläinen and hänen poikansa (Cottager and his son) (Eino Leino)
 Suvisia suruja (Summery sorrows) (Larin-Kyösti)
 Enkelten joululaulu paimenille (Angels singing to the shepherds) (Ilmari Pimiä)
 Joulun kellot (Bells of Christmas) (Ilmari Pimiä)
 Lapin joulu (Christmas in Lapland) (Larin-Kyösti)
 Orpo (Orphan) (Hiland Haahti)
 Kotia kohti (Going home) (Hiland Haahti)
 Muista kotiasi (Remember your home) (pseudonym Tyyne R.)
 Ensi lumi (The first snow) (Einari Vuorela)
 Uudelle vuodelle (To the New Year) (Arvily)
 Kaksoset (Twins) (Arvily)
 Köyhän antimet (Gifts of a pauper) (Arvily)
 Kehtolaulu (Nyt on aika pienen miehen unten maille kiiruhtaa) (Lullaby) (Arvily)
 Koulumatkalla (On the school trip) (Alli Nissinen)
 Tunnetko meidän pullean pojan (Do you know our chubby boy) (Annikki Setälä)
 Äiti and Nanu (Mother and Nanu) (Annikki Setälä)
 Äidin apulainen (Mother's little helper) (Annikki Setälä)
 Kahvikemut (Coffee party) (Salme Setälä)
 Tuhma Jukka (Naughty Jukka) (Salme Setälä)
 Yölaulu (Night song) (pseudonym Cartouche)
 Unten mailla (Asleep) (pseudonym Pojukissa)
 Nuorten laulukirja IV (Song book of the youth IV), Op. 134c (1929 or earlier) – Songs to one, two and three voices with piano (also a version with only one voice published 1929)
 Suomen nimi (Name of Finland) (Zachris Topelius)
 Korven kansan toivo (Hope of the poor people) (Alli Nissinen)
 Pyyntö (A plea) (Yrjö Teppo)
 Valkeille kirsikan kukille (To the white cherry blossoms) (Zachris Topelius)
 Sinivuokko (Liverwort) (Lempi Vihervaara)
 Kissankellolle (To the bluebell) (pseudonym Sirja-sisko)
 Orava (Squirrel) (pseudonym Pikku prinsessa)
 Narri-kissa (A cat named Narri) (Immi Hellén)
 Vappuratsastus (Riding of First of May) (Zachris Topelius)
 Iltahetki (Evening) (pseudonym Saarentyttö)
 Lapsikullat nukkukaa (Sleep my dear babies) (pseudonym "-a")
 Tuutulaulu (Tuutu mun lastani tupukkaa) (Lullaby) (Annikki Setälä)
 Afrikassa, keidasmaassa (In Africa, the land of oases) (Arvily)
 Syyskuu (September) (Lempi Paala)
 Onnellinen (Happy) (pseudonym Liekki)
 Mummon haudalla (On grandmas's grave) (pseudonym Inkeri)
 Maailma on suur (Wide is the world) (Zachris Topelius)
 Helvinpäivät (Name day of Helvi) (Salme Setälä)
 Kevään henki (Spirit of spring) (Zachris Topelius)
 Kevätleikki (Spring fun) (anonymous)
 Tule, joulu! (Oh come, Christmas!) (Lempi Vihervaara)
 Joulupäivä (Christmas Day) (pseudonym Tyyne R.)
 Jeesus siunaa lapsia (Jesus, bless the children) (Immi Hellén)
 Siunaus (Blessing) (Zachris Topelius)
 Den sista stjärnan, Op. 136, No. 1 (1930) Bo Bergman, unpublished
 Jorden är blott du och jag och mull, Op. 136, No. 2 (1927) Pär Lagerkvist, unpublished
 Springvandet, Op. 136, No. 3 (end of the 1920s) Helge Rode, unpublished
 Den døde tid, Op. 136, No. 4 (1927) Johannes Jørgensen, unpublished
 Lintunen (Little bird), Op. 138, No. 1 (1925-1925) Josef Julius Wecksell, in Finnish by Otto Manninen, unpublished
 Leivo, Op. 138, No. 2 (Aleksanteri Rahkonen) - Lärkan (Joel Rundt) – Skylark (Alex Bryan) – Several arrangements:  kantele by Eero Koskimies, guitar by Viljo Immonen, female choir by Eino Linnala, Violoncello by Vili Pullinen and instrumental group by Lauri Sarlin.
 Vappuratsastus (Riding of First of May), Op. 138, No. 3 (1925-1926) Zachris Topelius, unpublished
 Pustan poika, (Son of Hungarian steppes) Op. 138, No. 4 (1925-1926?) Sándor Petőfi, in Finnish by Otto Manninen, unpublished
 Koti kultaisin (Home sweet home), Op. 138, No. 5 (1925-1926?) Otto Manninen, unpublished
 Kehtolaulu joka vuodenajalle (Lullaby for each season), Op. 138, No. 6 (1925-1926?) Lempi Vihervaara, unpublished
 Talven tulo, (Winter is coming) Op. 138, No. 7 (1925-1926?) Aarne Kumpuniemi, unpublished
 Kevätlaulu (Spring song), Op. 138, No. 9 (1925-1926?) pseudonym T. S., unpublished
 Kolme syyslaulua (Three autumn songs), Op. 139 (1927-1928) - Tre höstsånger
 Sa lohdun, Herra (You give the comfort, Lord) Eemil Hiille - Du skänker tröst (Joel Rundt)
 Punakylkiset omenat (Red faces apples) Eeva Satakunta - De röda äpplena falla (Joel Rundt)
 Syystuuli soittaa (Autumn winds are playing) J. K. Kulomaa - Höstvinden spelar (Joel Rundt)
 Paimenelta (From a shepherd), Op. 140, No. 1 (1894) J. H. Erkko - Pastorale
 Schliesse mir die Augen beide, Op. 140, No. 2 (1927?) Theodor Storm - Lad mit trøtte øje lukkes (anonymous)
 Lasten maailmasta, Op. 141 (1927) - 10 pientä laulelmaa - Nuotinnoksessa ei ole erillistä melodiaääntä, laulut voi soittaa myös pianokappaleina.
 Alkaessa (Beginning) (Immi Hellén)
 Metsäpirtin lasten laulu (Song of the children in a cottage) (Aini Setälä)
 Mikin kengät (Mikki's shoes) (Salme Setälä)
 Hiekassa (Covered with sand) (Annikki Setälä)
 Nöpön tiput (Nöpö's chicken) (Annikki Setälä)
 Takkavalkean ääressä (By the fire) (Annikki Setälä)
 Säteet (Streams) (Annikki Setälä)
 Porolla ajo (Riding a reindeer) (Annikki Setälä)
 Poroparvi (Flock of reindeers) Annikki Setälä)
 Päivää, pukki (Good day, Santa Claus) (Immi Hellén)
 Nuorten laulukirja V (Song book of the youth V), Op. 146 (1927) – Songs to one, two and three voices with piano
 Jumalan kartano (God's seat) (Elina Vaara)
 Purjehdusretki (Sailing trip) (Elina Vaara)
 Uudelle vuodelle (The new year) (Arvily)
 Hiihtolaulu (Skiing song) (Arvily)
 Kalle and Ville (Kalle and Ville) (Arvily)
 Kinosten suojassa (Sheltered by the drifts) (Arvily)
 Kai and varjo (Kai and a shadow) (Arvily)
 Unikeko (Sleepyhead) (Arvily)
 Ilmapallot (Balloons) (Salme Setälä)
 Keinuhevonen (Rocking horse) (Salme Setälä)
 Joulupukki (Santa Claus) (Salme Setälä)
 Kahvikemut (Coffee party) (Salme Setälä)
 Pesen poikaa palleroista (Washing my plump son) (Annikki Setälä)
 Kissanpojat (Kittens) (Annikki Setälä)
 Muuttolinnut (Birds of passage) (pseudonym Pohjatuuli)
 Kultakalat (Goldfishes) (Anna Kaari)
 Rannalla (On the shore) (Anna Kaari)
 Lumisade (Snowing) ('Märchen Elisabeth)
 Taikalähde (Magical source) (pseudonym Leporello)
 Kissankellolle (To a bluebell) (pseudonym Sirpa-sisko)
 Unten mailla (Asleep) (pseudonym Pojukissa)
 Linnunpojat (Nestlings) (pseudonym Liekki)
 Jouluna (At Christmas time) (pseudonym Ruskolilja)
 Joulukellot (Christmas bells) (pseudonym Punapeippo)
 Suomalaisia kansanlauluja (Finnish folk songs), Op. 148 (1928 or earlier) - Finska Folkvisor - Finnische Volkslieder - 7 uutta kansanlaulua – Finnish folk songs, translations by Nino Runeberg - No attempt has been made to translate the original titles.
 Tule surma - Kom nu, död
 Ieva (recorded as Laiska Jaakko)
 Silloin minä itkin - Bittra tårar – Arrangement for 2 violins, Violoncello and double bass by Lauri Sarlin published
 Odottava - Den väntande
 Heilani kotiin - Piiritanssi - Till kärestans stuga - Ringdans
 Salainen suru - Hemlig sorg
 Tanssilaulu (Ähä, ähä, ämmäparat) - Dansvisa (Oh-oh, oh-oh, stackars gummor) – Arrangement for female chorus published
 Neljä laulua (Four songs), Op. 151 (1928) - Fyra sånger
 Kotihinsa muut menevät (Kalevala) - Till ett hem får andra styra (Joel Rundt)
 Maria, Guds moder (Ragnar Ekelund) - Sa Maaria, Neitsyt (Ilta Koskimies)
 Stjärnor (Carl Jonas Love Almqvist) - Tähdet (Jussi Snellman)
 Isä meidän (Our father) (Jussi Snellman) - Fader vår (Joel Rundt)
 Kahdeksantoista karjalaista kansanlaulua (18 Carelian folk songs), Op. 156 (1921?) - 18 kansanlaulua Käkisalmelta - Kahdeksantoista Karjalaista kansanlaulua – Folk songs, translations by  Nino Runeberg - No attempt has been made to translate the original titles.
 Pilvet ne varjosti - Sky vid sky
 Pellolla - Mitt på min pappas fält
 Köyhä poika - Klandra inte en fattig gosse
 Etelästä tuulee - När det blåser sunnanvind
 Joki - Älvens böljor - Flusswindung
 Hyvästijättö - Avskedssång
 Meinasin - Tänkte och tänkte att söka mig brud
 Pilalaulu (Mansikka on punainen marja)' - Smultronbäret
 Mun heilani - Vännen min
 Koivumetsä - I björkskogen
 Vankilaulu - En fånges visa
 Vankilaan mennessä - På väg till fängelset
 Yhdessä - Tillsammans
 Tulatulla - Om kvällen
 Lammen rannalla - Minns du? 
 Rallati koputin - Hei tralla och dalla-la!
 Naapurin likka - Grannens flicka
 Hulivilipoika - En slarvens visa
 Fem sånger till ord av Jarl Hemmer, Op. 162 (1930) Jarl Hemmer
 Vi som ännu leva
 Jag vill allting glömma
 Bön om ett nytt hjärta
 Sälg i sol – Paju auringossa (Erkki Ainamo)
 Tjugo år - Kaksikymmenvuotias (Erkki Ainamo)
Opuses 164 and 165 are all Finnish folk song arrangements - No attempt has been made to translate the original titles.
 Maailmalle matkani, Op. 164, No. 1 (1936 or earlier) – published 1958 in Viisi kansanlaulua
 Lahden laineilla, Op. 164, No. 2 (1936 or earlier) – published 1958 in Viisi kansanlaulua
 Älä mene heilani, Op. 164, No. 3 (1936 or earlier) – published 1958 in Viisi kansanlaulua
 Passaahan sitä, Op. 164, No. 4 (1936 or earlier) – published 1958 in Viisi kansanlaulua
 Se kunnia!, Op. 164, No. 5 (1936 or earlier) – published 1958 in Viisi kansanlaulua
 Hyvää iltaa, Op. 164, No. 6 (1930s) – Goder afton (Ture Ara) – published 1944 in Kaksi karjalaista kansanlaulua
 Mamman sinisilmä, Op. 165, No. 1 (1930s) unpublished - Var är mammas lilla flicka
 Vaikein hetki, Op. 165, No. 2 (1930s) – Den ensamme stunden (Ture Ara) – published 1944 in Kaksi karjalaista kansanlaulua - Vesper' premanta (possibly Vilho Setälä)
 Raitilla, Op. 165, No. 3 (1930s), unpublished
 Jos minä tietäisin kultani mielen. Op. 165, No. 4 (1930s), unpublished
 Kodista vieroitettu, Op. 165, No. 5 (1930s) unpublished
 Senpä tähden, Op. 165, No. 6 (1930s), unpublished
 Iltalaulu, Op. 165, No. 7 (1930s), unpublished
 Bröllopssång, Op. 166 (1930) Erkki Melartin - Häälaulu (Oi onni suuri) (Ilta Koskimies)
 Gondoolilaulu (Gondola song), Op. 167 (1930) Elina Vaara, unpublished)
 Te soikaa joulun kellot taas (Ring them Christmas bells again), Op. 169, No. 1 (1926) Aukusti Simelius – Voice and piano or harmonium - Kolme joululaulua (Three Christmas songs)
 Sa juhla talven keskellä, Op. 169, No. 2 (1926) Irene Mendelin - Voice and piano or harmonium
 Joulupäivä (Christmas day), Op. 169, No. 3 (1926) pseudonym Tyyne P. - Jouluna - Voice and piano or harmonium
 Tröst, Op. 170, No. 1 (1931) Johan Ludvig Runeberg - Lohdutus (Erkki Melartin) - Consolation (Edward Adams-Ray)
 Höstkvällen, Op. 170, No. 2 (1931) Johan Ludvig Runeberg - Kuin kalpeaa on kaikki (Pekka Sipilä) - Autumn eve (Edward Adams-Ray)
 Törnet, Op. 170, No. 3 (1931) Johan Ludvig Runeberg - Villiruusu (Erkki Melartin?) - The Briar (Edward Adams-Ray)
 Så jag färdas sjelf mot fjärran, Op. 171, No. 1 (1931) Johan Ludvig Runeberg - Miksi puron laine huokaa (anonymous)
 Hvarje årstid, Op. 171, ro 2 (1931) Johan Ludvig Runeberg, unpublished - Miksi puron laine huokaa (anonymous)
 Dagar komma, Op. 172, No. 1 (1931) Johan Ludvig Runeberg, unpublished - Päivä koittaa (Ture Ara)
 Mellan friska blomster, Op. 172, No. 2 (1931) Johan Ludvig Runeberg, unpublished - Loisteessa kukkain (Pekka Sipilä)
 Fågeln, Op. 172, No. 3 (1931) Johan Ludvig Runeberg, unpublished - Lintu (Ture Ara)
 Lapsille (To the children), Op. 173 (1930s, unpublished, lost) - 10 pientä laulua
 Lauluja Käkisalmelta (Songs from Käkisalmi), Op. 176 (1930s), unpublished, lost
 Aate (Idea), EM003 (1928?) Irene Mendelin - Voice
 Abendsegen, EM005 (1910-luku) anonymous text from 1680
 Ahdistuksessa (Anguish), EM006 (1932) Vilho Rantanen
 Aino neiti (Maiden Aino), EM007 (1911 or earlier) Eino Leino, published 1911 - Voice
 Ballaadi (Ballad), EM022 (1902) Santeri Ingman
 En blomma, EM027 (1902 or 1935) Viktor Rydberg
 Blomster i snee, EM028 (1895) Thor Lange, lost
 Crescendo, EM033 (1932) Uuno Kailas
 Det är en ros utsprungen, EM034 (1923, published 1925) traditional German text - Gammal julpsalm - Voice and organ or piano
 D'une prison, EM038 (?) Paul Verlaine
 Elannon laulu II (Song for Elanto), EM039 (1930, published 1933) Yrjö Jylhä – Voice (also for mixed choir)
 Es war zu unser Lenzeszeit, EM040 (1896) anonymous text - Piano and text
 For alle gode tanker, EM049 (1915) Jens Peter Jacobsen – Piano and text
 Fragment af en kärleksdröm, EM050 (1895) Karl August Tavaststjerna - 6 Sånger ur K. A. Tawaststjernas Fragment af en kärleksdröm
 Vi möttes, vi stannade, bytte en blick
 Vid min bok jag satt och drömde
 Jag söker att binda tillsamman
 Nu vill jag glömma att du bröt
 Och när du vaggat mitt hjärta
 Du var mig mera nära
 Förbi, EM053 (1911 Vilhelm Ekelund
 Den förrådda kärleken, EM055 (1931) Johan Ludvig Runeberg
 Een gammal Boord-Wijsa, EM056 (1898-1914, published 1918, 1976 and 2000) traditional Swedish text - Wanha kestilaulu (Jussi Snellman) - Voice and piano or lute
 Goternas sång, EM057 (1894) Viktor Rydberg
 Helmikuun ilta, EM062 (1911 or earlier, published 1911) Ilmari Kianto - Voice
 Henki, EM063 (1911 or earlier, published 1911) J. H. Erkko - Voice
 Herra Petteri, EM066 (1921?) traditional text
 Hosiannah, EM068 (1893) Gustaf Fröding
 Hur jag älskar dig, EM069 (1894) anonymous text
 I båten hade vi sabbat, EM072 (1895) Karl August Tavaststjerna
 Illan tullen (In the evening), EM074 (1913?) anonymous text
 Ilta hautausmaalla (Night in the graveyard), EM075 (1890-luku?, lost) anonymous text
 Iltarukous (Night prayer), EM077 (1907) Julius Krohn - Voice and piano or harmonium
 Im grünenden Wiesengrunde, EM078 (1894) anonymous text
 Im Walde, EM079 (tekstin tekijää ei tiedetä, 1911?, kadoksissa)
 Immelle (To a maid), EM080 (1893) Rietrikki Polén
 Ja! Kunde jeg se dig smile, EM087 (1934) Viggo Christiansen
 Jos olet mun! (If you'll be mine), EM089 (1894?) Larin-Kyösti
 Joskus virren vierettää (Sometimes you sing a hymn), EM090 (1928?) Rafael Engelberg - Voice
 Joululaulu (Christmas song), EM091 (1912, published 1912) Heikki Rytkönen - Taas kutsuvat kynttilät kirkkahat
 Kadonnut unelma (A lost dream), EM100 (1930 or earlier) Ture Ara (Composed by Erkki Melartin as pseudonym Erkki Mela)
 Kallis Asia (A precious thing), EM101 (1928?) pseudonym Hiland - Voice
 Karjalan vahti (Sentinel of Carelia), EM104 (1920, published 1921) Axel Stenius - Karelens vakt - Käkisalmen läänin rykmentin kunniamarssi - Kexholms läns regementes honörsmarsch
 Katajaisten marssi (March of Katajaiset), EM105 (1927, published) Arvid Lydecken – Voice or unison choir and piano
 Katseet kiehtovat (Charming looks), EM106 (1930s) Erkki Melartin - Voice
 Katson virran kalvohon (I look at the river), EM107 (1928 or earlier, published 1928) Veikko Antero Koskenniemi - Voice
 Kehtolaulu (Lullaby), EM108 (1926, published 1926) Arvily - Nyt on aika pienen miehen unten maille kiiruhtaa
 Keväinen kotiintuminen (Homecoming in springtime), EM110 (1911 or earlier, published 1911) Lauri Soini – Voice
 Komeroista (Out of the closets), EM114 (1928, published 1928) Heikki Välisalmi - Voice
 Korven koski (Rapids in the wilderness), EM115 (1920s?) Rafael Engelberg - Voice
 Kristallen den fina, EM118 (1920s) traditional Swedish text
 Kylän lahdella (On the bay near the village), EM126 (1899) Larin-Kyösti
 Kyntömiehen laulu (Plowman's song), EM127 (1911 or earlied, published 1911 and 1921) Vihtori Auer – Voice
 Käy työhön (Begin the work), EM129 (1928, published 1928) Severi Nuormaa – Voice
 Köyhän lapsen joulukuusi (Poor child's Christmas tree), EM130 (1928, published 1928) Aapo Pärnänen - Voice
 Nachtwache der Liebe, EM132 (1898) Alfred Meissner
 Lempeä laupeus taivainen (Heavenly mercy so sweet), EM133 (1927 or earlier, published 1927) Jussi Snellman - Voice
 Linden har blomst, og solsorten synger, EM135 (1924) Aage Lind
 Lintuseni (My little bird), EM136 (1932) Antti Räty
 Lisbeths sang, EM137 (1918) Erik Moltesen
 Lob des Weines, EM139 (?) Asraki
 Lovsång, EM141 (1933?, published 1954 and 2000) Bengt Lidner - Kiitoslaulu (Kyllikki Solanterä) - Voice and piano or organ
 Långt från land, EM145 (1931 or earlier) Jarl Hemmer
 Maamiehen toukolaulu (Farmer's May song), EM147 (Larin-Kyösti, 1911 or earlier, published 1911) – Voice
 Maamieslaulu (Farmer's song), EM148 (1928 or earlier, published 1928) Eero Eerola - Voice
 Maamieskoululaisten laulu (Farm school song), EM149 (1911 or earlier, published 1911) Eero Eerola - Nuorten maamiesten laulu - Voice
 Manta, EM151 (1930s?) Usko Kemppi, published and recorded 1939 - Voice and musical group - Composed by Erkki Melartin as pseudonym Erkki Mela
 Me seisomme yhtenä (We stand as one), EM153 (1928 or earlier, published 1928) Alfred Saukkonen - Voice
 Meill' on niin kiire (We are so in haste), EM155 (1928 or earlier, published 1928) Eino Leino - Voice
 Meit' runteli routa (We were tormented by the frost), EM157 (1928) Sulo Suortti - Voice
 Mieron nuotioilla (Distant campfires), EM161 (1898?) Eino Leino - Voice
 Mikä olenki utala (How tricky I am), EM162 (1895) J. H. Erkko
 Mount Lavinia, EM163 (1934) Carl Robert Lamm
 Muistathan (Do you remember), EM164 (1931) composition and text by Erkki Melartin as pseudonym Eero Mela  – Voice
 Musta kaarti (Black guards), EM165 (1928 or earlier, published 1928) original text Zachris Topelius, in Finnish by Aarni Kouta - Voice
 Mä nurmella uinun (On grass I am slumbering), EM167 (1911 or earlier, published 1911) Niilo Mantere – Voice
 Mädchenlied, EM168 (1898) Otto Julius Bierbaum
 Nouskaa maani nuoret voimat (Youth of my country, stand up), EM169 (1928, published 1928) Heikki Kahila – Voice
 Nuorisoseurakurssilaisten laulu (Song of the youth club students), EM171 (1909, published 1909) Eero Eerola - Nuorisoseuralaisten laulu - Voice
 Nuorukaiselle (To a youngster), EM173 (1928?) Mikko Uotinen - Voice
 När julen ringer, EM175 (1896) Holger Drachmann - Soprano, 2 violins, Violoncello and piano
 Oma maa (My own country), EM176 (1909 or earlier, published 1911) Samuel Gustaf Bergh - Voice
 Orvon laulu (Orphan song), EM178 (1928, published 1928) Eino Leino - Voice
 Orvon valitus (Lament of an orphan), EM179 (1928, published 1928) August Pärnänen - Voice
 Per Spelman, EM183 (1925) traditional Swedish text and melody
 Der Phönix, EM185 (1895) Heinrich Heine
 La Polusstelo, EM190 (1913, published 1913) Nino Runeberg
 Pyhä kevät (Holy spring), EM196 (1911 or earlier, published 1911) Eino Leino – Voice
 På floden, EM197 (1896) Nikolaus Lenau, translation by Viktor Rydberg
 På vägen, EM198 (1929) Arvid Lydecken
 Pälve (A patch of snow-free ground), EM199 (1911 or earlier, published 1911) Irene Mendelin – Voice
 Rannalla (On the shore), EM201 (1908) Veikko Antero Koskenniemi
 Rantakoivulleni (To my beach birch), EM202 (1911 or earlier, published 1911 and later in several song books) Ilmari Kianto – Voice
 Ristin vierelle (Beside the cross), EM204 (1927 or earlier, published 1927) teksti pseudonym "T.H.",  – Originally for reciter, mixed choir, arranged for one voice
 Rosa, EM205 (1928?) traditional Italian text and melody - La mamma di Rosa - Canto popolare di Napoli
 Salakari (Range of rocks), EM206 (1929, published 1929) Ture Ara - Karjalainen valssi (Carelian waltz) - (Composed by Erkki Melartin as pseudonym Eero Mela)
 Samarialainen vaimo (La Samaritaine - The Woman of Samaria), EM208 (1927) Edmond Rostand, in Finnish by Jalmari Finne
 Seppä (Blacksmith), EM211 (1928, published 1928) pseudonym G. A. L. – Voice
 Simo Hurtta, EM213 (1908) Eino Leino – Voice and kantele, see Other dramatic works
 Sjung!, EM215 (1913, published 1913) pseudonym Sylvia
 Den stulna kyssen, EM220 (1925?, published) Arvid Lydecken
 Sureva (Mourning), EM223 (1895-1897, published 1928 with a title Pois meni merehen päivä) Samuel Gustaf Bergh
 Suru (Grief), EM224 (1929) traditional Finnish text
 Syystervehdys opistolle (Autumn greeting to the college), EM226 (1928, published 1928) Oili Ora - Voice
 Tehtaantytön laulu (Factory girl's song), EM231 (1928, published 1928) Hiland Liinamaa – Voice
 Terve, terve Väinämöinen (Hail Väinämöinen), EM232 (1920s?) Jussi Snellman - Voice
 Toivojen tammi, veljespuu (The oak of hope), EM233 (1928, published 1928) Osmo Orjanheimo - Voice
 Toukolaulu (May song), EM234 (1911 or earlier, published 1911) Eero Eerola - Voice
 Tuli tuttu, vanha tuttu! (A friend, an old friend!), EM236 (1911 or earlier, published 1911) Larin-Kyösti – Voice
 Tuoll' on mun kultani (There goes my sweetheart), EM238 (1920s?) traditional Finnish text and melody
 Tuomenkukka (Bird cherry flower), EM240 (1920s?) pseudonym Astrid – Voice
 Tuutulaulu (Lullaby), EM241 (1908) Julius Krohn
 Työ and vapaus (Work and freedom), EM242 (1928 or earlier) Yrjö Veijola – Voice (arrangement for mixed choir published in 1956)
 Työnraatajan laulu (Song of a drudge), EM243 (1928, published 1928) Heikki Välisalmi – Voice
 Ukko-Pekan laulu (Song of Ukko-Pekka), EM245 (1936) Jussi Snellman - Pekan laulu (Ukko-Pekka is president of Finland [Pehr Evind Svinhufvud])
 Unga tankar, EM246 (1893) Nisse Holmberg
 Uus' ajanjakso alkaa (A new era is beginning), EM247 (1911 or earlier, published 1911) Niilo Mantere – Voice
 Veni Sancte Spiritus, EM251 (1900) liturgical text
 En visa i gammal stil, EM253 (1926) Märta Skarp
 Vuoren uumeniin (To the depths of the mountain), EM255 (1928, published 1928) Lauri Viljanen - Voice
 Yhteistyöhön yhteisvoimin (Together and united), EM259 (1928, published 1928) pseudonym Rautakoura - Voice
 Ylösnousemus (Resurresction), EM260 (1928, published 1928) Pietari Salmenoand – Voice
 Å ruusorna visna, EM262 (1912) Elin Golovin? - Och rosorna vissna - Å rusarna visna - Piano and text
 Äitien internationaali (Mothers' international), EM264 (1928, published 1928) anonymous text and translator - Voice
 Äitini (My mother), EM265 (1911 or earlier, published 1911) Zachris Topelius, in Finnish by Alpo Noponen – Voice
 Älfvan till flickan, EM266 (1902) Viktor Rydberg - Älvan till flickan
 Öisiä ääniä kuunneltiin (Listening to nightly sounds), EM267 (1935) traditional text - Humalamäen sillalla nätin tytön rinnalla
 7 canti popolari italiani, EM268 (1928, published 1929) traditional Italian folk songs, translations in Finnish by Jussi Snellman and in Swedish by Nino Runeberg,  - 7 italialaista kansanlaulua - 7 italienska folkvisor - Sette canti popolari italiani
 Senti a me! - Kuule mua!  - Hör på mig! 
 Quello che tu mi dici - Muut' älä vaadi multa - Nej, nej!
 La vera Sorrentina - Armaani - Den sköna från Sorrento
 Il Cavadenti - Hammastohtori - Tanddoktorn
 Padrona crudele - Julma nainen - Den grymma flickan
 Lisa mia! - Liisa kulta!  - Sköna Lisa!
 Mariannina - Taas mun täytyy sulle muistuttaa muita mielessäs ei olla saa - Jag har sagt det tusen gånger
 10 pikkulaulua (10 small songs), EM269 (1930-luku?)
 Mansikkalaulu (Strawberry song) Arvily
 Lapselle (To a child) Annikki Setälä
 Kauranteko (Oats) Einari Vuorela
 Kevät (Spring) pseudonym Inkeri
 Jouluaamuna (Christmas morning) pseudonym Cartouche
 Kotitonttu (Home nisse) Annikki Setälä
 Satu (Fairy tale) Elina Vaara
 Laulu pikku veikolle (Song to little brother) Elina Vaara
 Isän silmät (Father's eyes) Lempi Vihervaara
 Orava (Squirrel) pseudonym Pikku prinssi
 An Dionysos, EM290 (1898) Anacreon, translation in German Jacob Achilles Mähly
 Ballade, EM304 (1900) Ottokar Kernstock
 Ballatella, EM306 (1899) anonymous text
 Det bodde en furste i Urvädersgränd, EM327A (1921) Harriet Löwenhjelm
 Efteraar, EM328 (1916) Poul Andersen – sketch without text - Efterår
 Etäällä emostaan (Far from mother), EM334 (?) anonymous text
 Foraar, EM337 (1897) Ludvig Holstein - Forår
 Frühlingszeit, EM339 (1895) Aleksey Konstantinovich Tolstoy, translation by Friedrich Fiedler
 Hans Vili synger, EM358 (?) traditional text? - Lad Verden gaa
 Hautalaulu (Grave song), EM359 (1920s) anonymous – Part of the Finnish Rosicrucian ritual music (EM518)
 Hälsning i toner, EM369 (1932) Georg Mellin 
 Höstkväll, EM371 (?)Viktor Rydberg - Höstqväll
 I aften hører jeg, EM372 (1898) Valdemar Rørdam
 Im April, EM377 (1898) Emanuel Geibel
 Iwan och Gawian, EM393 (1897, lost) Oscar Levertin
 Jeg læste i de gamle enfoldige Legende, EM395 (1914) anonymous - Voice
 Kaisu Katariina, EM402 (1931) Music and text by Erkki Melartin as pseudonym Eero Mela
 Koivun valitus (Lament of a birch tree), EM413B (1921, lost) Kalevala
 Koko maailman polska (Polska for the whole world), EM414 (1901) Finnish folk song
 König, EM419 (1900) anonymous
 König bin ich! , EM420 (?)anonymous
 Laulu Kalevalasta (Song from Kalevala), EM423 (1900?) Kalevala
 Laulu valon sodassa (Song of light war), EM424 (1905) Eino Leino
 Die Lehre, EM425 (1890s?) Heinrich Heine
 Liebesjubel, EM430 (1898) Ernst von Wolzogen
 Liebesjubel, EM431 (1899) Ernst von Wolzogen
 Lied, EM432 (1898) Arno Holz - Aus weissen Wolken
 Litania, EM438 (1920's?) anonymous – Voice - Efter slutad kamp i gruset
 Loppulaulu (Ending song), EM439 (1920s) maybe Jussi Snellman - Part of the Finnish Rosicrucian ritual music (EM518) - Yö jo hallitsee, rauha vallitsee
 Luojan lintu (Bird of the Creator), EM441 (1904 or later) J. H. Erkko
 Mikä lie minunki luonut (Who has created me), EM463 (1900) Kalevala - Voice
 Min moder, EM464 (1928) Laurits Christian Nielsen – sketch without text
 Mjölnarens dotter, EM467A (1892) Alfred Tennyson, translated by "G. v. B."
 Modersmaalet, EM468 (1896) Nikolai Frederik Severin Grundtvig - sketch without text
 Morgonvinden, EM471 (1896) Anders Grafström
 Det odödliga, EM477 (1927) Karin Ek
 Outo mies, EM480 (1920s?) Unto Koskela
 Paimenelta, EM481 (1894) J. H. Erkko - Lauloipa mullekin laakson lintu
 Paimenpoika, EM482 (Immi Hellén, ?) - Voice
 Partasuupukki, EM483 (tekstin anonymous, 1927) – Voice (ilman tekstiä)
 På Heden, EM511 (1898?) Valdemar Rørdam - Paa Heden
 Pääskyselle (To a swallow), EM512 (1892) Jooseppi Mustakallio – Same text but different melody than in Op. 107, No. 3
 Da Rauber, EM514 (1894) – folk song from Tyrol
 Rauha (Piece), EM515 (1898) Eino Leino
 Reisliv, EM516 (?) anonymous
 Salainen saari (Our hidden island), EM521 (1920) Jussi Snellman
 Scherzo för sång utan ord, EM529 (1917) - Voice, piano and violin, no text
 Der Seelenkranke, EM530 (1896) Nikolaus Lenau
 Som våg emot stranden, EM542 (1919) Jacob Tegengren
 Suomen lippulaulu (Flag song of Finland), EM551 (1918?) Larin-Kyösti
 Takamailla (Backwoods), EM554 (1899?) Larin-Kyösti
 Till honom, EM556 (1898) Arvid Mörne
 Till Ida Quarnström på 70 årsdagen, EM557 (1918) anonymous
 Unendlicher Canon, EM563 (1913) Adelbert von Chamisso
 Unendlicher Canon, EM564 (1915) Adelbert von Chamisso
 Vereinsamt, EM571 (1890-luku?) Friedrich Nietzsche
 En visa om mig och narren Herkules, EM575 (1897) Gustaf Fröding
 Visan om trösten, EM576 (1903) Fanny Norrman - Voice
 Yksin, EM578 (1915) – No text
 Young leaves, EM579 (1935) Sarojini Naidu

Melodramas (reciter and accompanying instrument(s) 
 Maria, Op. 108 (1915) Veikko Antero Koskenniemi - Neitsyt Maarian rukous - Nu stiger månen bak Libanons fjäll (Nino Runeberg) - Reciter with harp or piano (melodrama)
 Marjatan laulu (Marjatta's song), Op. 145, No. 1 (1928) Eino Leino - Marjattas sång (Rafael Lindqvist) – Reciter and piano (melodrama)
 Stridsmännen i berget, Op. 145, No. 2 (1928) Jarl Hemmer - Vuoren sotijat (L. Onerva) – Reciter and piano (melodrama)
 Columbus, Op. 175, No. 1 (1935) Nino Runeberg, unpublished – Reciter and piano
 Nordens sommar, Op. 175, No. 2 (1935) Jarl Hemmer, unpublished - Pohjolan suvi (Jussi Snellman) – Reciter and piano
 I kvällen stund ur furuskogens gömma, EM073 (1902) Sven Falck? - Melodram före tablån - Reciter and piano
 Angelika, EM299 (1901) Bernhard Elis Malmström – Reciter and piano
 Nuori Väinämöinen (Young Väinämöinen), EM476 (1929) Eino Leino – Reciter and piano
 Vapautettu kuningatar, EM570 (1907) Paavo Cajander – Reciter and piano
In addition several dramatic works by Melartin contain part for a reciter.

Compositions for a voice and orchestra 
 Irma impi (Maid Irma), Op. 31, No. 1 (1904 or earlier, unpublished) Eino Leino - Ballad för sopran och orkester
 Torre di Nerone, Op. 31, No. 2 (1904, unpublished) August von Platen-Hallermünde, translation by Giosuè Carducci – Baryton and orchestra
 Betlehems stjärna, Op. 31, No. 3 (1897) Viktor Rydberg - Soprano, mixed choir, piano, harmonium and 2 violins - Beetlehemin tähti (Hilkka Norkamo) - Published only as an arrangement for a choir in 1979
 Marjatta, Op. 79 (1914) Kalevala – Soprano and orchestra
 Alalá, EM008 (1924) Spanish folk song - Voice and string orchestra
 Karjalainen kansanlaulusarja I (Carelian suite of folk songs I), EM103 (1930) Carelian folk songs - Voice and string orchestra
 1. Pilvet ne varjosti - 2. Rallati koputin - 3. Pappani pellolla - 4. Hyvästijättö - 5. Kun etelästä tuulee - 6. Sureva - 7. Heilani - 8. Naapurin likka 
 Meiram, EM156 (1899-1902) Eino Leino – Voices and orchestra, see Other dramatic works
 Tuoll' on mun kultani, EM239 (1920s) Finnish folk song

Choral works  
Cantatas and dramatic works with choir parts are listed under respective entries.
 Vårdträdet, Op. 51, No. 1 (1903) Viktor Rydberg - Male choir and orchestra
 Ilmarisen nuoruus (Youth of Ilmarinen), Op. 51, No. 2 (1908, unpublished) Eino Leino – Baryton, male choir and orchestra
 Ikävä (Dullness), Op. 57, No. 1 (1908?) J. H. Erkko - Male choir
 Jungfru Maria i rosengård, Op. 57, No. 2 (1900 or earlier) Viktor Rydberg - Male choir
 Nu är det helg över hafvet, Op. 57, No. 3 (1898-1900) Vilhelm Krag - Male choir
 Olla mullai (I wish I had), Op. 57, No. 4 (1899?) Ilmari Kianto - Male choir
 Häälaulu (Wedding song), Op. 57, No. 5 (1907) J. H. Erkko - Male choir
 Savolle (To Savo), Op. 57, No. 6 (1907) August Snellman – Male or mixed choir
 För si sådan är kärlekens begäran, Op. 57, No. 7 (1903-1904) Mikael Lybeck - Male choir
 Selvä mies (A sober man), Op. 57, No. 9 (1909) Kanteletar Mixed choir
 Till fosterlandet, Op. 61, No. 1 (1909 or earlier) Rafael Lindqvist - Mixed choir - Isänmaalle (Jalmari Finne) - Published as piano arrangement by Melartin1909
 Var redo!, Op. 61, No. 2 (1911) Nino Runeberg - Marsch för boyscouts - Partiopoikain Marssi - Mixed choir - Ollos valmis (Jalmari Finne) - Published as piano arrangement by Melartin1911
 Kansanvalta (Power of the people), Op. 61, No. 3 (1910) Eino Leino – Unison choir and piano
 Päivän laulu (Song of the day), Op. 61, No. 4 (1903) Eino Leino - Unison choir and piano –arrangements for female choir (Melartin) and mixed choir (P. J. Hannikainen) published
 Karjalalle (For Carelia), Op. 61, No. 5 (1908) A. Söderman - Mixed choir and piano - Laulu Karjalalle
 Aattehet (Ideas), Op. 61b, No. 1 (1909 or earlier) J. H. Erkko - Mixed choir
 Vappulaulu, Op. 61b, No. 2 (1911) Larin-Kyösti – Unison choir – arrangement for mixed choir (Melartin) published
 Aamulla (In the morning), Op. 61b, No. 3 (1905) J. H. Erkko - Mixed choir
 Aittalaulu (Granary song), Op. 61b, No. 4 (1907) Larin-Kyösti - Mixed choir
 Darthulas gravsång, Op. 61b, No. 5 (1897) Johan Ludvig Runeberg - Mixed choir - Darthulan hautalaulu (Yrjö Veijola)
 Kukat Pinciolla (Flowers on Pincio), Op. 61b, No. 6 (1911) J. H. Erkko –  – Unison choir – arrangement for mixed choir (Melartin) published
 Piirilaulu (Circuit song), Op. 61b, No. 7 (1913 or earlier) Finnish folk song - Mixed choir
 Sju små julsånger, Op. 103 (1918 or earlier) - 7 små julsånger - 7 pientä joululaulua - Seitsemän pientä joululaulua – Unison choir and piano or harmonium – Translations by Jussi Snellman
 Till Betlehem (Johan Michaël Lindblad) - Betlehemiin
 Ende Sonen stiger neder (P. W-I.) - Poika isän ainokainen – Arrangement for children's choir (Lars Johan Gustav Stråhle) – arrangement for voice and string quartet (Ilkka Kuusisto)
 Du strålande Betlehemsstjärna (tekstin tekijää ei tiedetä) - Yön keskellä tähtönen loisti
 I Betlehem lyste en stjärna (Mikael Nyberg) - Jo paistavi tähtönen Betlehemin
 Se natten flyr (Johan Olof Wallin) - Kas yössä kirkkaus leimuaa - Mixed choir
 Himmelens Herre har kommit till jorden (anonymous) - Taivasten Herran nyt maan syli sulkee - Mixed choir
 Jag vet ett namn (Lina Sandell) - Mä tunnen nimen rakkahan - Mixed choir
 7 psalmer (7 hymns), Op. 113 (1914) - 7 virttä - Mixed choir
 Bön om frid (Johan Ludvig Runeberg) - Rauha (Alpo Noponen)
 En psalm (Jag ber till dig i mitt betryck)  (Oscar Levertin) - Virsi (Sua, Herra huudan tuskassain) (Ilta Koskimies)
 Aftonpsalm (I Herrens hand) (Johan Ludvig Runeberg) - Iltavirsi (Ma Herran huomaan) (Alpo Noponen)
 Morgonpsalm (I mörker höljs)  (Johan Ludvig Runeberg) - Aamuvirsi (Yö hälveni, and päivä luo nyt kirkkaiks' ilman rannat) (Alpo Noponen)
 Förbliv hos mig (anonymous) - Luoksein jää!  (Ilta Koskimies)
 Bön i landsplåga (Johan Ludvig Runeberg) - Rukous maanvaivassa (Ilta Koskimies)
 Psalme (Tag mod Vorherres sendebud) (Erik Moltesen) - Virsi (Nyt saapuu Herran sanoma) (Jussi Snellman)
 Sekakuorolauluja (Songs for mixed choir), Op. 142 - Mixed choir
 Minä seison (I stand) (1927) Aini Setälä
 Takamailla (In the backwoods) (1928) Larin-Kyösti
 And nythän on taasen helluntai (Now is the time of whitsun) (1927) Larin-Kyösti
 Helluntain hymni (Hymn of the whitsun) (1927) Väinö Kolkkala
 Eespäin! (Forward!) (1927?) Josef Julius Wecksell, translation Topi Kallio
 Hanget soi (Snow crusts are clinging) (1927?) Eino Leino
 Syyskuun kesä (Summer in September) (1899) Juhani Aho
 Kevätlaulu (Spring song) (1927?) Johann Wolfgang von Goethe, translation Otto Manninen
 Kolme duettoa (Three duets), Op. 155 (1929 or earlier) - Tre duetter – Two voices and piano
 Pyyntö (A plea) Yrjö Teppo - Åkallan (Nino Runeberg)
 Tähtien laulu (Song of the stars) Arvid Lydecken - Stjärnornas sång (Nino Runeberg)
 Onnelliset (The happy ones) pseudonym Ignotus - Sällhet (Nino Runeberg)
 Sju mystiska botpsalmer (Seven mystic penitence psalms), Op. 182 (1910/1934, unpublished) Nino Runeberg - Mixed choir
 Modestia
 Silentium
 Castitas
 Fortitudo
 Munificentia
 Amor mortis
 Amor proximi
 Alla taivahan tähtikorkean (Under the heaven and the stars), EM010 (1927 or earlier) Jussi Snellman - Mixed choir
 Din boning, Herre, EM035 (1927) Jacob Tegengren - Mixed choir?
 Djäknevisa, EM036 (1924, published 1925) Ernst V. Knape - Teinilaulu (L. Onerva) – Mixed choir
 Elannon laulu II (Song for Elanto II, EM039 (1930, published 1933) Yrjö Jylhä - Elantos sång (Elmer Diktonius) – Mixed choir
 Fuga - Benedictus - Canon, EM052 (1896?) liturgical text – Mixed choir or a song group and string quartet
 Gud välsigne, EM058 (1927) maybe Anders Gustaf Lindqvist – Mixed choir
 Halleluja, EM059 (1901) – Mixed choir and organ (text contains only on word, Halleluja)
 Herra, Luoja, taivasten (Lord, Creator of the heavens), EM065 (1927 or earlier, published 1927) A. Oksanen – Unison choir
 Hur ljuvliga äro icke dina boningar, Herre Sebaoth, EM070 (1926) The Bible - Liturgy and Mixed choir
 Hymnus, EM071 (19111/1932) Erkki Melartin and Jussi Snellman - Hymni - Hymni Helsingin konservatoriotalon vihkiäistilaisuuteen – Unison choir and orchestra
 Jesus Kristus kommen är, EM088 (1895) Aurelius Ambrosius – Mixed choir
 Jouluna (At Christmas), EM092 (1926 or earlier, published 1926) Aukusti Simelius - Mixed choir
 Jouluyö (Christmas night), EM094 (1925 or earlier, published 1925 and 1927) Jussi Snellman - Nukkuu maa kuin kuolon unta – Unison choir
 Joutsenet, EM095 (1909, published 1911) Otto Manninen – Two voices
 Juldagen, EM097 (1926) The Bible - Reciter and choir
 Kaarlo ja Emelie Bergbomin muistolle, EM099 (To the memory of Kaarlo and Emilie Bergbom) (1907, published 1907) A. V. Koskimies - Kaarlo and Emelie Bergbomin patsasta paljastaissa 19 2/X 07 - Vid aftäckningen af Kaarlo och Emelie bergboms grafmonument (Bertel Gripenberg) - Mixed choir
 Katajaisten marssi (March of Katajaiset), EM105 (?, published) Arvid Lydecken – Unison choir and piano
 Kulkurin virsi (Vagabond's hymn), EM119 (1914) Larin-Kyösti - Male choir
 Kullan luo (Going to my dearest), EM120 (1896, published 1898) J. H. Erkko - Mixed choir or four voices
 Kummanko sävel somempi (Whose melody is the prettiest), EM121 (1925, published 1925) A. O. Väisänen – Male choir
 Kuoleman kautta (Through death), EM122 (1927) Jussi Snellman – Alto, tenor and piano
 Kvällsvind spelade, EM124 (1903, published 1907) Mikael Lybeck – Mixed choir - Soittaa tuulonen (Jussi Snellman)
 Kyntömiehen laulu (Song of the plowman), EM127 (1911 or earlier) Vihtori Auer, published 1911 for one voice – arrangement for mixed choir and piano published 1921
 Kyrie, EM128 (1932) liturgical text – Four voices or mixed choir and piano or organ
 Luojan päivä (Day of the Creator), EM142 (1933) Jussi Snellman – Three female voices or female choir
 Me kasvamme (We are growing), EM152 (1901 or earlier, published 1901) Eino Leino - Vi växa (K. V. Forsman or Thekla Roschier) - Male choir
 Nu börand himmelens stjärnor blekna, EM170 (1902?) anonymous – female choir, reciter and piano quartet
 Nuorten laulu (Song of the youth), EM172 (1908, published 1916) Eino Leino - Suomen Koulunuorisoliiton marssi - Mixed choir
 Osuustoimintamarssi (Cooperation march), EM180 (1932) Uuno Kailas - Mixed choir
 Ota se kaunis kannel taas (Take that beautiful kantele again), EM181 (1901, published 1935) Larin-Kyösti – Male choir and tenor solo
 Perún, EM184 (1898) Mikael Lybeck - Male choir
 La Polusstelo, EM190 (1913, published 1913) Nino Runeberg - Himno de Finnlandaj Esperantistoi - Suomen esperantistien hymni- Male choir
 Le revéil du bois, EM203 (1917) Victor Kinon - Soprano, choir and orchestra
 Saligt är ditt folk, EM207 (1926) Swedish liturgical text – Liturgy and mixed choir
 Savonlinnan toverikunnan marssi (March of the students in Savonlinna), EM209 (1895) August Snellman - Toverikunnan marssi - Mixed choir
 Serenad, EM212 (1895) anonymous - Male choir or male vocal group
 Snöfallet, EM219 (1917, published) Osvald Sirén – Mieskvartetti
 Työ and vapaus (Work and freedom), EM242 (1928) Yrjö Veilin – arranged for mixed choir 1956 (Kaarle Lehtinen)
 Tänk på din skapare, EM244 (1926) The Bible – Liturgy and mixed choir
 Yön tullessa (While the night comes), EM261 (1918) Simo Korpela - Mixed choir
 Äiti armas, kaikkes annoit mulle (Dear mother, you gave me all), EM263 (1928 or earlier, published 1929) Martti Malmgren - Mixed choir
 Agnus Dei, EM277 (1895) liturgical text– Soprano and mixed choir
 En dag i Herrens gårdar, EM326 (1926) The Bible – Liturgy and mixed choir
 Guds rena Lamm! , EM353 (1895) Nicolaus Decius, translation by Olaus Petri – five voices (soprano I, soprano II, alto, tenor and bass)
 Jos voisin (If only I could), EM396 (?) Finnish folk song – Female choir
 Koraali (Chorale), EM415B (1916?, published 1923) – four voices without text
 Koraali (Chorale), EM415C (1923?, published 1923) – four voices without text
 Koraali (Chorale), EM415D (1923?, published 1923) – four voices without text
 Koraali (Chorale), EM415B (1927?, published 1929) – four voices without text
 Olkohon taiteemme niinkuin tammi (Let our art stand like an oak), EM478 (1901) Eino Leino  - Male choir
 Porraslaulu (Songs of steps), EM497 (1920s) Jussi Snellman – Mixed choir - Part of the Finnish Rosicrucian ritual music (EM518)
 Requiem, EM517 (1905) liturgical text - Soprano, mezzo-soprano, alto and bass – Not a proper requiem but a short composition for the play Hämärän lapsia (Twilight children).
 Rituaalimusiikkia Ruusu-Ristille (Finnish Rosicrucian ritual music), EM518 (1920s) anonymous – voices and piano – The title is not authentic but a descriptive one.
 Suru ilossa (Sorrow in happiness), EM552 (1895) anonymous – Mixed choir?
 Öppna mitt öga, EM582 (1918) Lina Sandell – Four voices

Cantatas 
 Vid frågornas port, Op. 43 (1907) Hjalmar J. Procopé - Kysymysten portilla (Jussi Snellman) - Helsingin yliopiston promootiokantaatti - Promotionskantat 1907 - Published as piano arrangements only.
 De frågande - Kysyjät
 Sollandet - Auringon maa
 Månlandet - Kuutamon maa - Moonland (M. Lockwood)
 De sökande - Etsijät
 Drömmaren - Uneksija
 Livets välde - Elämän valta
 Fruktan för döden ingen förlame! - Turhaa on langeta pelkohon kuolon! 
 Stridssång - Sotalaulu
 Kantat vid Finska Läkarsällskapets hundaårsjubileum (Cantata for the Finnish Medical Society's 100 years celebration), Op. 178 (1935, unpublished) Jarl Hemmer - Örtagårdsmannen - Kantaatti Suomen Lääkäriseuran 100-vuotisjuhlaan – soloists, choir and orchestra
 Etsijä (The Seeker), EM042 (1925) Jussi Snellman – soloists, choir and piano
 Festkantat (Festive cantata), EM102 (1924, published 1939) Jacob Tegengren, translation by Jussi Snellman – mixed choir, reciter and instrumental group
 Den tysta hjältemod - Hiljainen sankaruus
 Hemmet – Koti
 Fosterlandet - Isänmaa
 Koulutiellä (On the way to school), EM117 (1930) Anna Puranen - Porin tyttölyseon 50-vuotisjuhlakantaatti – Soloists, choir and orchestra
 Kylväjät (Planters), EM125 (1925, published 1939) L. Onerva - mixed choir and orchestra (orchestrated by Helvi Leiviskä)

Symphonies 
Only No. 6 printed during Melartin's life. Erkki Melartin Society has already edited and published nos 1, 3, 4 and 5 in PDF-format. 
 Symphony No. 1, Op. 30, No. 1, C minor (1901-1902, unpublished)
 Symphony No. 2, Op. 30, No. 2, E minor (1904, unpublished)
 Symphony No. 3, Op. 40, F major (1907/1908)
 Symphony No. 4, Op. 80, E major (1912-1913/1916) - Kesäsinfonia - Summer Symphony – There are female voices without text in part Andante
 Symphony No. 5, Op. 90, A minor (1908/1914-1915) - Symphony brevis
 Symphony No. 6, Op. 100 (1918-1924) - Elementtisinfonia - Elementernas symfoni – Symphony of Elements
 Symphony No. 7, Op. 149 (1928/1936?, only the first part Allegro and several sketches exist, unpublished) - Symphony gaia
 Symphony No. 8, Op. 186 (started 1936, unfinished) - Parts: Allegretto – Andante – Allegretto – Intermezzo (Allegretto) – Allegretto – Andante
 Symphony No. 9, Op. 188 (just some structural plans survive)

Other orchestral works 
For a large orchestra, unless otherwise stated.
 Legend II, Op. 12 (1900-1901, unpublished – published as piano arrangement)
 Siikajoki, Op. 28 - (1903-1904, unpublished) – Striden vid Siikajoki – Symphonic poem
 Serenadi, Op. 31, No. 4, E major (1904-1906) - String orchestra
 A la marcia
 Idyll
 Menuetto
 Canzone
 Gavotte - Rondo
 Lyyrillinen sarja II (Lyric suite II), Op. 56 (1908) - Lyrisk svit II - Lyrische Suite II - Published as piano arrangement by Melartin
 Iltapäivä - Eftermiddag - Nachmittag
 Raskas uni - Tung dröm - Schwerer Traum
 Tuutulaulu - Vaggvisa - Wiegenlied
 Menuetto
 Noitatanssi - Trolldans - Phantastischer Tanz - Fantastischer Tanz
 Traumgesicht, Op. 70 (1910) - Symphonische Musik - Sinfonista musiikkia - Unikuva - Drömsyn – Symphonic poem for orchestra
 Patria, Op. 72 (1911, unpublished) - Symphonic poem for orchestra - Symphonische Studie für grosses Orchester
 Lyydinen sarja (Lydic suite), Op. 102 (1935?) Lydische Suite – Chamber orchestra
 Sursum corda, Op. 125 (1925?, unpublished) - Ylentäkää sydämenne - Ein festliches Präludium - String orchestra
 Laatokan lauluja (Songs of Laatokka), Op. 146a (8.1.1929) - Ladogasånger - Karjalaisia lauluja - Käkisalmen lauluja – Chamber orchestra – Folk song arrangements
 Karjalaisia kuvia (Carelian views), Op. 146b (1928, unpublished) Chamber orchestra - Karelische Rhapsodie für kleines Orchester - Karjalan kuvia
 Intermezzo, Op. 147 (1929, unpublished) - Chamber orchestra
 Divertimento, Op. 152 (1928, unpublished) - Chamber orchestra 
 1. Preludio - 2. Menuetto (Pastorale) - 3. Giocoso (Humoreski) - 4. Berceuse - 5. Intermezzo - 6. Elegia - 7. Danza
 Lohdutus (Consolation), Op. 168 (1930-1931?, unpublished) Chamber orchestra - Tröst 
 Suomalainen fantasia (Finnish fantasy), Op. 180 (1930s, lost)
 Yksilö ja massa (Individual and the crowd), Op. 184 (1936, unpublished) Ballet music for orchestra - Individen och massan
 Allegretto A minor, EM011 (1930s?)
 An der Pforte, EM013 (beginning of the 1900s?)
 Andante, EM014 (1897, unfinished)
 Capriccio, EM030 (1901)
 Harlekiini (Harlequin), EM061 (1930s?) – Orchestral version of Prinssin tanssi, EM508
 Hymni (Hymn), EM070 (1911)
 Intermezzo, EM081 (1910, published 1993) – String orchestra with a violin solo
 Keijujen karkelo (Dance of the fairies), EM109 (1905, lost) - Älfvornas dans – Älvornas dans
 Kevätaamun unelma (Spring morning dream), EM111 (1905)
 Kuutamossa (Moonlight), EM123 (1930s, arranged by Sven Sandberg)
 Lyyrillinen sarja I (Lyric suite I), EM143 (1906) - Lyrisk suit I - Lyrische Suite I
 Preludio (arrangement of opus 25:1)
 Certosa (arrangement of opus 27:2)
 Intermezzo
 Virran reunall (arrangement of opus 25:2)
 Idyll (arrangement of opus 27:1)
 Ballade (arrangement of opus 27:4)
 Lyyrillinen sarja III (Lyric suite III), EM144 (1915-1916) - Lyrische Suite III - Lyrisk svit III - Suite lyrique 3 - Liritšeskaand sjuita - Belgialainen sarja - Vaikutelmia Belgiasta - Impressions de Belgique - Impressions lyriques
 La Cathédrale - Katedralen – Tuomiokirkko (arrangement of opus 93:1)
 Nocturne - Bruges
 Scherzo
 Pastorale - Adoration des bergers
 Les Cloches – Kellot (arrangement of opus 93:6)
 Hymne matinale - Matin sur la côte
 Manaus (Incantation), EM150 (1933) - Shamaanimanaus - Beschwörung
 Muunnelmia Kajanuksen Hautalaulusta (Variations on Kajanus' Grave song), EM166 (1933) - In memoriam Robert Kajanus
 Pastorale, EM182 (1909) - Erakko – Eremiten – Der Einsiedler
 Piccolo minuetto, EM188 (1.5.1912) - String orchestra
 Scéne dansante, EM210 (1930-luku?) - Chamber orchestra
 Symfonisk fantasi, EM226 (1904?, only partially survived) - Sinfoninen fantasia
 Tempo di valse, EM231 (1929)
 Väinämöinen luo kanteleen (Väinämöinen creates his Kantele), EM256 (1906) - Väinämöinen muovailee kantelettaan – Wäinämöinen danar sin Kantele – Tablåmusik
 Aamuhymni (Morning hymn), EM270 (1908?)
 Intermezzo, EM389 (1936)
 Karjalainen rapsodia (Carelian rhapsody), EM407 (1908) - Karels rapsodi – Karjalaisia piirilauluja I
 Scherzo, EM526 (1905)
 Shamaanin kohtaus (Shaman scene), EM531 (1929) – Orchestra and wordless choir – Planned as a part of ballet Sininen helmi, Op. 160, but left out
 Sinfoninen andante (Symphonic andante), EM533 (1901, lost)

Works for solo piano 
 Variationen und Fuge, Op. 2 (1898) – Dedicated to Selim Palmgren
 2 Balladen, Op. 5 (1898) Två ballader
 Två svanor - Kaksi joutsenta - Zwei Schwäne
 Anime sole
 Legend I, Op. 6 (1898) - Legenda I – Legende I
 Lastuja I (Chips I), Op. 7 (1900 or earlier) - Spånor I - Späne I 
 Ro, ro, fiskarmor - Kalastajan kehtolaulu - Vanha kehtolaulu - Old cradle song - Schlaflied
 Suvi-illan vieno tuuli
 Keinutan kehtoa
 Jeg synes, at verden skinner
 Ej har jag hem
 Jag vill still tacka dig
 3 Stücke für Clavier, Op. 8 (Lokakuu 1899)
 Elegie
 Romance
 Nacht
 Lastuja II (Chips II), Op. 9 (1898 -1900) - Spånor II - Späne II
 Iltalaulu - Aftonsång - Abendlied
 Kehtolaulu - Vaggvisa - Schlaflied
 Melodia - Melodi - Melodie
 Kevätlaulu - Vårsång - Frühlingslied - Spring song
 L'heure bleue - Sininen tunti
 Hautauslaulu - Begravningssång - Grablied
 Skizzer (Sketches), Op. 11 (1901) - 5 stycken för piano 
 Frid - Rauha - Stille - Quietude
 Midnatt - Keskiyö - Mitternacht - Midnight
 Hösttankar - Syysaatteita - Herbstgedanken - Autumns thoughts
 Liten ballad - Pieni ballaadi - Kleine Ballade - Little ballad
 Från Karelen - Karjalasta - Finnish - Finnish folksong
 Legend II, Op. 12 (1900-1901) – Legenda II
 Intermezzi, Op. 16 (1902 or earlier)
 Ratsastaja metsässä - Ryttaren i skogen - Der Reiter im Walde - The Rider
 Chanson
 Tanssilaulu I Dansvisa I - Tanzweise I - Two dances I
 Tanssilaulu II Dansvisa II - Tanzweise II - Two dances II
 Menuett, Op. 16, No. 5 (1899 or earlier)
 Lyyrillisiä pikkukappaleita (Lyric pieces), Op. 18 (1903 or earlier) - Lyrische Stücke - Lyriska småstycken - Lyriska stycken
 Kansanlaulun tapaan - I folkvisestil - Lied im Volkston
 Vuorella - På berget - Auf dem Berge
 Rannalla - Vid stranden - Am Strande
 Iltakuva - Aftonbild - Abendbild
 Kesäilta Sommarafton - Sommerabend (folk song arrangement)
 Pienoiskuvia I (Miniatures), Op. 23 (1905 or earlier) - Miniatyrer för pianoforte - 8 leichte Stücke
 Menuetto
 Valssi - Vals
 Kehtolaulu - Vaggvisa
 Ilta - Afton
 Japanilainen tanssi - Japansk dans
 Pastorale
 Odottava - Den väntande
 Tarantella
 Prélude B flat minor, Op. 25, No. 1 (1906) 
 Virran reunall (On the banks of a river), Op. 25, No. 2 (sovitettu 1903)
 Humoresk A major, Op. 25, No. 3 (1906 or earlier)
 Arietta, Op. 25, No. 4 (1898 or earlier) - Arietta all'antica – free arrangement for violin and piano by Willy Burmester published 1912
 Pieni gavotti (A little gavotte), Op. 25, No. 5 (1901) - Gavotte i gammal stil – free arrangement for violin and piano by Willy Burmester published 1912
 Idyll, Op. 27, No. 1 (1906 or earlier) - Idylli
 Certosa, Op. 27, No. 2 (1906 or earlier)
 Suomen salossa, Op. 27, No. 3 (1898?)
 Ballade, Op. 27, No. 4 (1906?) - Balladi
 Små variationer, Op. 33, No. 1 (1906) - Pieniä variatsiooneand - Pieniä variationeand - Kleine Variationen
 Etyde E major, Op. 33, No. 2 (1897)
 Träskodans (Clog dance), Op. 33, No. 3 (1906 or earlier) - Puukenkätanssi - Holzschuhtanz
 Lastuja III, Op. 34 (1906) - Spånor III - Späne III - Chips III
 Praeludium
 Berceuse 
 Au revoir
 Suomalainen tanssi - Finsk dans - Finnischer Tanz
 Orientale
 Pienoiskuvia II (Miniatures II), Op. 35 (1906 or earlier) - Miniatyrer för piano II
 Venezialainen ilta - Veneziansk afton - Venezianischer Abend
 Iltatunnelma - Aftonstämning - Abendstimmung
 Valitus - Klagan - Klage
 Aamu - Morgon - Morgen
 Sairasvuoteella - På sjukbädden - Auf dem Krankenbett
 Tanssi - Dans - Tanz
 Laulu - Visa - Lied
 Kehruulaulu - Spinnvisa - Spinnerlied
 Lastuja IV (Chips IV), Op. 48 (1907) - Spånor IV - Späne IV
 Tuutulaulu - Vid vaggan - An der Wiege
 Pieniä variationeja - Miniatyr variationer - Miniaturvariationen - Små variationer - Kleine Variationen
 Aaltoja - Böljor - Wellen
 Tapisserie
 Jäähyväiset - Avsked - Abschied
 Walzer-Miniatyren, Op. 49 (1907)
 Anette-Sofie
 Thérèse
 Adèle
 Violet
 Der traurige Garten, Op. 52 (1908) - Surullinen puutarha – Dedicated to Jean Sibelius
 Wir zwei - Me kaksi
 Liebesallee - Lemmentie - Rakastavien tie
 Wiegenlied eines Bettlerkindes - Kerjäläislapsen kehtolaulu
 Regen - Sade
 Solitude - Yksinäisyys
 Pienoiskuvia III (Miniatures III), Op. 53 (1908) - Miniatyrer III
 Suomalainen laulu -Finsk visa - Finnisches Lied
 Muisto - Minne - Erinnegung
 Valse lente
 Menuette al' antico
 Suomalainen tanssi - Finsk dans - Finnischer Tanz
 Preludio
 Fughetta
 Tunnelmia (Moods), Op. 54 (1908 or earlier) - Stämningar - Stimmungen
 Omistus - Tillegnan - Zueignung
 Raskaalla hetkellä - Under en tung stund - Während einer schweren Stunde
 Capriccio
 Kysymys - En fråga - Eine Frage
 Kansanlaulu - Folkvisa - Volkslied
 Energico
Lyrik I (Lyric pieces), Op. 59 (1909) - Lyyrillisiä pianokappaleita - Lyrisches
 Barcarole
 Romance
 Berceuse
 Intermezzo
 Impromptu E minor
 Mazurka, Op. 66, C minor (1910)
 Vier Klavierstücke (Four piano pieces), Op. 67 (1910 or earlier)
 Abendklang - Iltasointi - Iltasointi
 Scherzo Es major
 Elegie
 Brauttanz - Morsiustanssi
 Berceuse, Op. 68, F major (1910 or earlier)
 Quatre morceaux, Op. 75 (1913 or earlier)
 Humoresque - Humoreske
 Chant du Juillet - Juli-Lied
 Berceuse, cis-molli
 Aubade
 9 pientä kappaletta pianolle (9 small pieces for piano), Op. 76 (1913 or earlier) - 9 Små stycken för piano - 9 Kleine Stücke für Klavier
 Metsäruusu - Waldrose - Vildros - A hedge rose
 Piiritanssi - Ringelreigen - Ringdans - Roundelay
 Ländler - Country dance
 Melodia - Melodie - Melodi - Melody
 Vanha taru - Es ist eine alte Geschichte - En gammal sägen - An old story
 Muistikirjan lehti - Albumblatt - Albumblad - Album leaf
 Kansanlaulu - Volkslied - Folkvisa - Folksong
 Iltarauha - Abendruhe - Aftonlugn - Evening rest
 Tanssi - Tänzchen - Dans - Dance
 Kuvakirja I (Book of images I), Op. 81 (1915?) - Bilderbok - Bilderbuch - Helppoja pikkukappaleita pianolle - Lätta småstycken för piano - Leichte Klavierstücke
 Illan tullen - När kvällen kommer - Der Abend kommt
 Saksalainen kansanlaulu - Tysk folkvisa - Gut'n morgen
 Kyyneleittä - Utan tårar - Ohne Tränen
 Pieni valkonen perhonen - Den lilla vita fjäriln - Der kleine weisse Schmetterling
 Viimeinen kerta - Sista gången - Zum letzten Mal
 Pikku tanssi - Liten dans -Tänzchen
 Feuillets d'Album, Op. 83 (1914) - Små stycken för piano
 Chanson matinale
 Intermezzo
 Bagatelle
 Esquisse
 Menuet
 Elegie
 Berceuse (pour un coeur triste) - Kehtolaulu väsyneelle sydämelle – arrangement for violin, Violoncello and piano by Melartin published 1928
 Sonatiini pianolle (Sonatine for piano), Op. 84 (1915) - "Quatre Sonatines" – arrangement for violin and piano published
 24 preludier, Op. 85 (1913-1920) - 24 Präludien - 24 Preludes
 Grekisk Offerhandling - Griechische Oppferhandlung - Old Grecian Ceremony
 Capriccio
 Studie - Study
 Méditation - Meditation
 Körsbärsblom i Japan - Kirchenblüte in Japan - Cherry Blossoms in Japan - Japanilaisia kirsikankukkia
 Afton i Venedig - Abend in Venedig - Evening in Venice
 Speldosa - Pelikello - Spieluhr - Musical Box
 Tung afton - Schwerer Abend - Evening before the Storm
 Lugn afton - Stiller Abend - Quiet Evening
 Vinterväg - Winterweg - Winter-Road
 Canon
 Folkvisa - Volkslied
 Scherzino
 Höstnatt - Herbstnacht - Autumn-night
 Romans - Romanze - Romance
 Ballatella
 Vårmorgon - Frühlingsmorgen - Spring morning
 Robustamente
 Intermezzo
 Tempo di mazurka
 Aning - Ahnung - Presentiment
 Beslutet - Beschluss - Decision
 Löftet - Versprechen - Promise
 Energico
 Noli me tangere, Op. 87 (1914 or earlier) - Stämningsbilder - Stimmungsbilder - Impressions
 Snöstämning i skymningen - Dämmerung in Schnee - Twilight in the snow
 Helgdagsmorgon - Feiertagsmorgen - Pyhäpäivän aamu - A festive morning
 Aning - Ahnung - Presentiment - Aavistus
 Dödsstund - Todesstunde - The hour of Death
 Höstvind - Herbstwind - Autumnal wind
 Miniatyrsvit ur Sanningens pärla, Op. 88a (1915-1920?)
 Prolog
 Entr'acte
 Berceuse
 Marche miniature
 Polska
 Ljus och skugga (Light and shadow), Op. 91 - Valoa and varjoa - Licht und Schatten - 7 småstycken för piano - 7 pikkukappaletta pianolle - 7 kleine Stücke für Klavier
 Morgonvisa - Aamulaulu - Morgenlied (1915)
 Skuggan - Varjo - Der Schatten (1898)
 I solskenet - Päivänpaisteessa - Im Sonnenschein (1898)
 Valse lente (1915)
 Preludio (1915)
 Afton på berget - Ilta vuorella - Abend auf dem Berge (1915)
 Sjömansdans - Merimiestanssi - Matrosentanz (1915)
 Pennteckningar (Pencil drawings), Op. 92 (1915-1916) - Kynäpiirroksia
 Hälsning - Tervehdys
 Scherzino
 Vemod - Surumieli - Traurigkeit - Sadness
 Vaggvisa för ett sjukt barn - Kehtolaulu sairaalle lapselle
 Chanson triste
 Canzoncina
 Humoresk
 Per speculum in enigmatae, Op. 93 (1912-1913, unpublished) - Wie in einem Spiegel
 Katedralen
 Die andere Seite
 Dunkle Träume
 Schwester Namenlos
 Erinnerung published as Souvenir and opus 87a, No. 5 in Finlandia V 1945
 Weihnachtsglocken
 7 pianostycken (7 piano pieces), Op. 98 - 7 pianokappaletta
 Den tysta skogen (1917 or earlier) - Hiljainen metsä - La Forêt silancieuse - Der schweigende Wald - Metsätunnelma - Skogsstämning
 Skymning vid ån (1917 or earlier) - Dämmerung am Bachesufer - Joen rannalla hämärtää
 I höjden (1919 or earlier) - In der Höhe - Korkeudessa - Korkeuksissa - On high - Legenda III - Legend III - Legende III
 Gavotte, A major
 Romans (1917 or earlier) - Romance - Romans över namnet S-a-s-c-h-a G
 Scherzo (1919 or earlier)
 Exeunt omnes (1919, only a fragment is known, unpublished)
 Partita in modo antico, Op. 101 (1917 or earlier, unpublished) - Svit i gammal stil 
 Preludio
 Aria
 Courante
 Giga
 Skuggspel (Shadow play), Op. 104 (1919 or earlier)
 Lantlig dans
 Ballatella
 En hemlighet
 Piccola Sarabanda
 Tempeldans
 Irrbloss
 Farväl
 Röster ur Skymningen (Voices from the dusk), Op. 110 (1916-1917) - Ääniä hämäryydestä - 5 pianostycken – Five piano pieces
 Barnporträtt - Lapsikuva - Lapsen muotokuva
 Menuetto languido
 Skymningsdans - Hämärän tanssi
 Skymningsbild - Hämärän kuva - Utukuva
 Bjällerklang - Kulkunen - Kulkusten kilinä
 Fantasia apocaliptica, Op. 111 (1918-1920?) - Sonat I för piano - Sonata I per il pianoforte - Sonata apocaliptica – Piano sonata I
 Festpreludium (Festival prelude), Op. 112 (1920) Festligt preludium – Guldbröllopsspel – Goldhochzeitsmusik (unpublished)
 En morgondröm och andra stycken för piano, Op. 114 (1910s?, lost)
 Salaperäinen metsä (The mysterious forest), Op. 118 (1923 or earlier) - Den hemlighetsfulla skogen - 6 pianostycken - Miniatyrsvit för piano
 Suuskuva - Höstbild - Herbstbild
 Salaperäinen metsä - Den hemlighetsfulla skogen - Der geheimnissvolle Wald
 Noita - Häxan - Die Hexe
 Loitsu - Trollruna - Beschwörung
 Virvatulet - Irrblossen - Irrlichten
  Noitatanssi - Trolldans - Trolltanz
 Nuorta elämää I (Youth life I), Op. 119a (1922 or earlier) - Ungt liv - Junges Leben - Kappaleita lapsille - Stycken för barn - Kinderstücke
 Kävely - Promenad - Spaziergang
 Hyräily - Gnolad visa - Stilles Lied
 Valitus - Klagan - Klage
 Leikki - Lek - Spiel
 Kaksi totista setää - Två allvarliga farbföder - Die zwei ernsten Onkel
 Nurmella - På ängen - Auf der Wiese
 Nuorta elämää II (Youth life II), Op. 119b (1922 or earlier)
 Minuettino
 Skotlantilainen kansanlaulu - Skottsk folkvisa - Schottisches Volkslied
 Tuutulaulu - Vaggvisa - Schlummerliedchen
 Pilvinen ilta - Mulen kväll - Wolkiger Abend
 Nuoren tytön laulu - Den unga flilckans visa - Lied des jungen Mädchens
 Polska - Bauerntanz - Danse rustique
 Nuorta elämää III (Youth life III), Op. 119c (1922 or earlier)
 Hyväily - Une caresse - Smekning - Liebkosung
 Karjalaiset paimenet - Karelska herdar - Zwei Hirten aus Karelien
 Maantielaulu - Landsvägsvisa
 Valsette
 Polkette
 Onnittelumenuetto - Gratulaticusmenuett - Gratulationsmenuett
 Nuorta elämää IV (Youth life IV), Op. 119d (1922 or earlier)
 Jouluvirsi - Julpsalm - Weihnachslied
 Surumielinen laulu - Sorgsen visa - Trauriges Lied
 Ländler
 Pieni marssi - Liten marsch - Kleiner Marsch
 Barcarola - Barcarole
 Iltakellot - Aftonklockorna - Abendglocken
 Varjokuvia (Silhouettes), Op. 120 (1922 or earlier) - Silhouetter - Schattenrisse
 Sisarukset - Syskonen - Die Geschwister
 Sureva tyttö - Den sörjande flickan - Das traurige Mädchen
 Menuetto hämärässä - Menuett i skymningen - Menuett in der Dämmerung
 Partiomarssi - Scoutmarsch - Pfadfindermarsch
 Aamuvirsi - Morgonpsalm - Morgenpsalm
 Iltavirsi - Aftonpsalm - Abendpsalm
 Valse lente
 Kansanlaulu - Folkvisa - Volkslied
 Iltakuva Karjalasta - Aftonstämning från Karelen - Abendbild aus Karelien
 Maalaistanssi - Lantlig dans - Ländlicher Tanz
 Retkeilylaulu - Vandringssång - Wanderlied
 Humoreski - Humoresk - Humoreske
 Iltarauha (Tranquility of the night), Op. 123, No. 1 (1924) – Aftonro
 Marcia funèbre, Op.123, No. 2 (1925 or earlier)
 Idyll, Op. 123, No. 3 (10.7.1925) - Idylle
 Procession, Op. 123, No. 4 (1925 or earlier)
 Pastorale, Op. 123, No. 5 (15.7.1925)
 Piccola marcia, Op. 123, No. 6 (1926 or earlier)
 Hemlängtan, Op. 126, No. 1 (1924-1925) - Koti-ikävä
 Månskensfart, Op. 126, No. 2 (1924-1925) - Kuutamoyö
 Dans, Op. 126, No. 3(1924-1925) - Tanssi
 Lyrik II (Lyric pieces II), Op. 127 (1924-1925)
 Skymningsvisa - Hämärän laulu - Im Zwielicht
 Morgonandakt - Aamuhartaus - Morgenandacht
 Menuett i väntan - Menuetto odottaessa - Menuett in Erwartung
 Valse sentimentale
 Österlandsk natt - Itämainen yö - Morgenländische Nacht
 Couplett
 Valse miniature, Op. 129, No. 1 (1926 or earlier) - Albumblad – Finsk musik – Sechs Klavierstücke
 Dans, Op. 129, No. 2 (1926 or earlier)
 Intermezzo, Op. 129, No. 3 (1926 or earlier)
 Preludio, Op. 129, No. 4, B major (1926 or earlier)
 Folkvisa, Op. 129, No. 5 (1926 or earlier)
 Jongleur, Op. 129, No. 6 (1926 or earlier)
 Sonatiini pianolle, No. 2 (Sonatine for piano II), Op. 135a (1927, unpublished) - Sonatina II al antica - Sonatina II al'antico – Arranged for flute and harp, see opus 135b
 Romanza, Op. 135, No. 2 (1932, unpublished)
 Kuvia (Pictures), Op. 137 (1927 or earlier) - Bilder - 12 Pientä pianokappaletta nuorisolle - 12 små pianostycken för ungdom (opus number in publication 137a)
 Rattoisa retki - Den trevliga utfärden
 Linnun hautaus - Fågelns begravning
 Kodin kynnyksellä - På hemmets tröskel
 Kevätsade - Vårregn
 Tuutulaulu - Vaggvisa
 Ylpeä ratsu - Den stålte gångaren
 Yksinäinen paimen - Den ensamma herden
 Kevätiloa - Vårfröjd - Canon
 Lumisilla - Leka snöboll
 Pilalaulu - Skämtvisa
 Tumma ilta - Mörk afton
 Leikki - Lek - Intermezzo
 Kaksi viikkoa (Two weeks), Op. 143 (1928?) - Viikonpäivät - Pianokappaleita nuorisolle
 Viisi sormea (Five fingers)
 Vastakkain (Against each other)
 Leikki (Play)
 Tanssi hämärissä (Dance in twilight)
 Torvet (Horns)
 Kyläsoittaja (Village fiddler)
 Sunnuntairauha (Sunday peace)
 Pyhä and arki (The holy and the everyday), Op. 144 (1924-1925) - Helg och söcken - Feier- und Werktage - 7 pientä pianokappaletta nuorisolle - 7 småstycken för piano för ungdom - 7 kleine Stücke für die Jugend
 Enkelten laulu jouluyössä - Änglarnas sång julnatten - Der Gesang der Engel in der Christnacht
 Lasten joululaulu - Barnens julvisa - Der Kinder Weihnachtslied
 Työtä aljettaissa - Vid arbetets begynnelse - Beim Beginn der Arbeit
 Korvessa - I storskogen - Im Walde
 Rantakuva - Strandbild
 Japanilainen kuva - Japansk bild - Japanisches Bild
 Loppumarssi - Slutmarsch - Schlussmarsch
 Helmivyö I (String of pearls I), Op. 159a (1929) - Pärlbandet I - Suomen kauneimmat kansanlaulut Suomen nuorisolle - Finlands vackraste folkvisor för Finlands ungdom
 1. Maamme (Vårt land – Our country) / Composer Fredrik Pacius - 2. Matkamies (Vandraren) - 3. Aamulaulu (Kun aamun aurinko - Morgonvisa) - 4. Vanha kehtolaulu (Gammal vaggvisa) - 5. Kukkuu, kukkuu - 6. Tyttö on kaunis kuin keväällä ruoho (Flickan är vacker som gräset om våren) - 7. Järven rannall' (På sjöstranden) - 8. Sydämein on tallella (Mitt hjärta är mitt) - 9. Kuu ei anna valoa (Månen lyser ej mer) - 10. Och jungfrun hon går i dansen (On neidolla punapaula) - 11. Sureva nuorukainen (Den sörjande ynglingen) - 12. Du är så vacker för mina ögon (Sa oot niin kaunis mun silmissäni) - 13. Iltalaulu (Aftonsång) - 14. Köyhä poika (Den fattige gossen) - 15. Sydämestäni rakastan (Av hela hjärtat älskar jag) - 16. Nytpä nähdään (Nu få vi se) - 17. Voi minua poika raukkaa (O, ve mig arma gosse) - 18. Voi äiti parka and raukka (O moder, arma moder) - 19. Där gingo två flickor i rosendelund (Kaks neitosta käveli puistossa) - 20. En voi sua unhoittaa (Jag kan dig aldrig glömma)
 Helmivyö II (String of pearls II), Op. 159b (1929) - Pärlbandet II
 1. Suomen laulu (Suomis sång – Song of Finland) / Composer Fredrik Pacius - 2. Vanha kehtolaulu (Gammal vaggvisa) - 3. Aamulla (Om morgonen) - 4. Rannalla itkijä (Den gråtande på stranden) - 5. Häälaulu (Bröllopssång) - 6. Älä mene heikolle jäälle (Gå ej på svag is) - 7. Viheriäinen maa (Den gröna jorden) - 8. Kananmuna (Hönsägget) - 9. Aikoand entisiä (Svunna tider) - 10. Voi jos ilta joutuisi (Ack, om Kväll ren vore) - 11. Korkealla vuorella (På det höga berget) - 12. Kaunis ruusunnuppu (En vacker rosenknopp) - 13. Tytön posket punottaa (Flickans kinder rodna) - 14. Pappa se sanoi (Pappa han sade) - 15. Hengellinen kansanlaulu (Andlig folkvisa) - 16. Minun kultani kaunis on (Skön är min älskade) - 17. Kaiho (Vemod) - 18. Hyvää iltaa, lintusein (God afton, fågeln min) - 19. Sinulle, ystäväiseni (Till dig, min lilla vän) - 20. Viherjäisen niityn poikki (Över den gröna ängen)
 Barnens vecka (Children's week), Op. 163 (1931?) - Sju lätta stycken för piano – 7 småstycker för piano
 Barnen leka - Söndag
 Arbetet börjar - Måndag
 Duett - Tisdag
 Den fattige gossens visa - Onsdag
 Motorn - Torsdag
 Vemod - Fredag
 Arbetet är gjort - Lördag
 Legenda IV, Op. 174 (1896?, unpublished)
 Variationeja (Variations), Op. 177 (1930s?, unpublished) – based on the theme of opus 2
 Sonatina III, Op. 181, A major (1896?/1930s, unpublished) - Sonaatti vanhaan tyyliin
 Seppä and liekki (Blacksmith and the flame), Op. 183 (1935)
 A rivederla! , EM001 (1904) - Piano (or string orchestra)
 Aamuvirsi (Morning hymn), EM002 (1916) – Uusi aamu
 Albumblad, EM009 (1900?, published 1900) - Andante, E minor
 Allegro energico, EM012 (?)
 Andante espresso, EM016 (1897)
 Andantino, EM017 (1906 or earlier, published 1906)
 Andantino, EM018 (?) A minor
 Arosävelmä (Melody from the steppes), EM019 (1906 or earlier, published 1906)
 Aubade, EM20 (1901)
 Ballade, EM023 (1896)
 Barcarolle, EM024 (1895) - Gute Morgen
 Berceuse, EM025 (1897)
 Bourré, EM029 (1906 or earlier, published 1906)
 Duetto, EM037 (1890-luku?)
 Espanjalainen laulu (Spanish song), EM041 (1906 or earlier, published 1906) - Spanska visa
 Ferne!, EM045 (1905)
 Festmarsch åt far och mor, EM048 (1901) – Födelsedagsmarsch
 Frühlingsliedchen, EM051 (1895) - Es war zur goldnen Frühlingszeit
 Födelsedagsmarsch, EM054 (1920)
 Couplet, EM065 (1923) - Smaa-bitte Ting
 Ett hjärtas vaggsång, EM067 (1914)
 Ilta Italiassa (Night in Italy), EM076 (1906 or earlier, published 1906)
 Intermezzo, EM082 (1911/1915)
 Intermezzo, EM083A (1895)
 Intermezzo, EM083B (1895)
 Intermezzo, EM084 (?)
 Intrata, EM086 (1904)
 Joulutunnelma (Christmas mood), EM093 (?)
 Juhlakulkue (Parade), EM096 (1906 or earlier, published 1906)
 Jänis (A hare), EM098 (1906 or earlier, published 1906)
 Kihlaus (Betrothal), EM112 (1898) – sketch
 Kiinalainen surumarssi (Chinese funeral march), EM113 (1906?)
 Kotipihlajan laulu (Song of the rowan tree back home), EM116 (1906?)
 Kuutamossa (Moonlight), EM123 (?)
 Laulu hämärässä (Song in dusk), EM131 (?, lost)
 Lied, EM134 (1892)
 En liten morgonvisa (A small morning song), EM138 (1915)
 En liten romansunge (A small romance), EM139 (18.8.1917) - Liten romans
 Maailma suuri (World is so big), EM146 (1929?) - Jorden så stor – Världen den stora
 Menuetto, EM159 (1906 or earlier, published 1906) C major
 Metsämajani (My cottage in the woods), EM160 (1903?)
 Nyt on mun mielestäni (I think, now is the time), EM174 (1901 or earlier, published 1901)
 Prélude, D flat major, EM191 (?)
 Preludium, E major, EM192 (1896)
 Prélude, F major, EM193 (1912)
 Prélude No. 4 E minor, EM194 (1892)
 Präludium & Fuga, D minor, EM195 (1896)
 Pääskysen hyvästijättö (Swallow's goodbye), EM200 (1906 or earlier, published 1906)
 En sjöman älskar havets våg (A sailor loves the waves), EM216 (1929?) - Merimies kanssa aaltojen
 Skämt (A joke), EM217 (?)
 Slädfärd (Sledging), EM218 (?)
 Suite I, EM221 (1892-1893, unfinished)
 1. Prélude - 2. Courante - 3. Sarabande - 4. Gavotte - 5. Musette - 6. Menuet
 Suomalainen tanssi (Finnish dance), EM222 (1894)
 Suvilaulu (Summer song), EM225 (1927?, published 1928) - Vårvisa - Frühlingsweise
 Taivahan ääriin lauluni soikoon (My song shall ring to the heaven), EM228 (1929?) - Klinge min sång till himlarnas höjd
 Talvi-ilta (Winter evening), EM229 (1927?, published 1928) - Vinterafton - Winterabend
 Tranquillo, EM235 (1898) Piano for four hands
 Tulitanssi (Fire dance), EM237 (1920s?)
 Vaggvisa (Lullaby), EM248 (?)
 Variatsiooneja (Variations), EM249 (1906 or earlier, published 1906)
 Venelaulu (Boat song), EM250 (1898)
 Vindens visa (Song of the wind), EM252 (1918)
 Voi, jos ilta joutuisi (If only the evening should come), EM254 (1901 or earlier, published 1901) 
 Väsyneen lapsen kehtolaulu (Lullaby for the tired child), EM257 (1927?, published 1927) - Vaggsång för ett trött barn - Wiegenlied für ein müdes Kind
 Wie schön leuchtet der Morgenstern, EM258 (?)
 Aamulla (In the morning), EM271 (1932) – Works between EM271-585 are mostly incomplete and survive as sketches only
 Abend, EM272 (1910)
 Afsked, EM273 (1893) - Avsked
 Aftonpsalm, EM274 (1917 / 1922)
 Agitato, EM275 (1897)
 Agitato, EM276 (1925)
 Aino, EM278 (1897)
 Alkulaulu (Starting song), EM279 (1927)
 Alla italiana, EM280 (1915)
 Alla polacca, EM281 (1894)
 Alla polacca, EM282 (1895)
 Allegretto, EM283 (1914)
 Allegretto, EM283 (1932)
 Allegretto simplice, EM283 (1893)
 Allegro energico, EM286 (1929)
 Allegro risoluto, EM289 (1898?)
 Andante, EM291 (1896?)
 Andante, EM292 (1926) - Sorgmusiken för Erik Moltesen
 Andante, EM293 (1928)
 Andante, EM294 (1931)
 Andante, EM295 (1934)
 Andante cantabile, EM296 (?)
 Andantino agitato, EM297B (1912)
 Anekdot, EM298 (1932, published 1912) - Bagateller – 10 lätta stycken för piano
 Arietta, EM300 (1899) - Madrigale
 Bachanal, EM301A (1895)
 Bagatell, EM301B (1913)
 Balettscenen, EM302 (1902)
 Ballade, EM303A, b-molli (1893)
 Ballade, EM303B (1894)
 Ballade, EM305 (1897)
 Ballett, EM307A (1897)
 Ballettscen, EM307B (1895)
 Barcarole, EM309 (1894)
 Barcarole, EM310 (1902)
 Bathseba, EM311 (1902)
 Berceuse, EM312 (1897)
 Berceuse, EM313 (1897)
 Berceuse, EM314, G major (1897)
 Berceuse, EM315 (1910)
 Berceuse, EM316 (1917)
 Berceuse, EM317 (1924)
 Canzonetta, EM320 (1897)
 Canzonetta al'antique, EM321 (1897)
 Capriccio, EM322 (1895)
 Chanson, EM323 (1900)
 Chanson Farväl, EM324A (1919)
 Consolation, EM324B (1891) – Melartin's first completed composition
 Crescendo, EM325 (1890-luku)
 Dockornas marsch (March of the puppets), EM327B (1894) - Kinderstück
 Einige Blätter, EM329A (?)
 Ej för fort (Not too quickly), EM329B (1895)
 Eroico, EM330 (1901)
 Etude, EM331 (1898)
 Etude, EM332 (1903)
 Etude, EM333 (1904)
 Festmarsch, EM335 (1898)
 Festpolonäs, EM336 (1910-luku)
 Fosterländsk melodi (Patriotic melody), EM338 (1909?)
 8 fuugaa (8 fugues), EM341 (1890-luku) – Fuga à 3 voci – Fuga à 4 voci – In modo mixolidico
 Fuga 3 voix, EM342 (1893)
 Fugato, EM343B (1893)
 Gammaldags (Like in old days), EM345 (1914)
 Gammalvisan (Song of the old days), EM346 (1902)
 Gavotte, EM347 (1895)
 Gavotte, EM348 (1898)
 Gavotte, EM349, G major (1900)
 Gavotte all'antique, EM350 (1896)
 Gigue, EM351, e-molli (1908)
 Greven og Kongedotteren (Count and the princess), EM352 (1890-luku?)
 Guldbröllpsdans (Golden wedding dance), EM354 (1920)
 Guldbröllpsmenuett (Golden wedding minuet), EM355 (1920)
 Gunghästen (Rocking horse), EM356 (1932 or earlier, published 1932) - Bagateller – 10 lätta stycken för piano
 Habanera, EM357 (1920)
 Heilaani menen minä katsomaan (Going to see my girl), EM360 (?)
 Heilani meni, EM361 (My girl has gone) (1917)
 Heilani posket on punaiset (My girl has red cheeks), EM362 (1917)
 En helsning (Greeting), EM363 (1900)
 Hemlängtan till södern (Yearning for South), EM364 (1919)
 Humoresk, EM365 (1898)
 Humoresk, EM366 (1912)
 Humoresk, EM368, G major (1932 or earlier, published 1932) - Bagateller – 10 lätta stycken för piano
 Hääsoitto (Wedding music), EM370 (1920) – Bröllopsmusik
 I båten (In the boat), EM373 (1932 or earlier, published 1932) – Bagateller – 10 lätta stycken för piano
 Idylle, EM374 (1918)
 Idylle i Italien, EM375 (1890s?)
 Impressions, EM378 (1914)
 Impromptu, EM379 (1894)
 Impromptu, EM380 (1899)
 Impromptu, EM381 (1902)
 In the hour of death, EM382 (1912)
 Intermezzo, EM385 (1904) – Idyll
 Intermezzo, EM386 (1908) - Capriccio
 Intermezzo, EM387 (1925)
 Intermezzo, EM388 (1928)
 Intermezzo II, EM390 (1892)
 Intiaanitanssi (Indian dance), EM392 (1929)
 Jeesus siunaa (Jesus is blessing), EM394 (1927?)
 Joululaulu (Christmas song), EM397 (?) - Julsång
 Joutsen (A swan), EM399 (1898) – Au crépuscule
 Julmorgon (Christmas morning), EM400 (1932 or earlier, published 1932) – Bagateller – 10 lätta stycken för piano
 Järven, järven, järven jäällä (On the frozen lake), EM401 (1917)
 Kansanlaulu (Folk song), EM405 (?)
 Kansansävel (Folk melody), EM406 (?)
 Kehtolaulu (Lullaby), EM408 (1908)
 Kinderstück, EM409 (1890s?)
 Kinderstücken, EM410 (1896)
 Kiputytön laulu (A girl in pains singing), EM411 (1898 or later)
 Kleine Etüde, EM412 (1903-1912)
 Klunkom Welam Welamsson, EM413A (1898?)
 Kuusi on metsän kuningas (Spruce is the King of the Forest), EM418 (1917)
 Largo, EM421 (1898)
 Largo, EM422 (1913)
 Lento, EM426 (1894)
 Lento, EM427 (1916)
 Lento all' Händel, EM429 (1896)
 Lied, EM433 (1903)
 Lied, EM434 (1907) - Preludium
 Lied, EM435 (1912)
 Lied, EM436 (1915) – Chanson
 Den lilla sjöjungfrun (The little mermaid), EM437 (1909?, lost)
 Ländler, EM442 (1911)
 Mantra, EM443 (1920s) - Part of the Finnish Rosicrucian ritual music (EM518)
 Marcia funèbre, EM444 (1898)
 Maria Stuart Skotlannissa (Maria Stuart in Scotland), EM445 (1930?)
 Marsch, EM446 (1929)
 Marssi, EM447 (?)
 Marsch, EM448 (?)
 Marssi, EM449 (1908)
 Med en blåklocka (With a bellflower), EM450 (1932 or earlier, published 1932) - Bagateller – Blåklocka – 10 lätta stycken för piano
 Melodie, EM451 (1890s)
 Melodie, EM452 (1900) - Grabgesang
 Menuetto, EM453 (1896)
 Menuetto, EM454 (1900)
 Menuetto, EM455 (1929)
 Menuetto, EM456, B major (?) 
 Menuetto, EM457, A minor (?)
 Menuetto al antique, EM459A (1896)
 Menuetto lento, EM459B (1927)
 Metsä (Forest), EM459C (1910) - Skogen
 Metsämaja (Cottage in the woods), EM460 (?)
 Miekkatanssi (Sword dance), EM461 (1926) 
 Mietiskely (Meditation), EM462 (1920s?) - Part of the Finnish Rosicrucian ritual music (EM518)
 Miniatures, EM465 (1897)
 Minuee, EM466 (?) – Menuett i finsk folkstil – Menuett im finnischen Volkstyle
 Moderato affettuoso, EM467B (1894)
 Morgonbön, EM469 (1915)
 Morgonljus vid kusten (Morning light on the seashore), EM470 (?)
 Notturno, EM474 (1901)
 Pastorale, EM484 (1896)
 Pastorale, EM485 (1896)
 Pastorale, EM488 (1930)
 Petit valse, EM489 (1898)
 Petite valse, EM490 (1921)
 Petsamo, EM491 (1920-luku?)
 Pianokappale (A piano piece), EM492, G major (1899)
 Piccolo minuetto, EM494 (1924)
 Pienet merihevoset (Small sea horses), EM495 (1929) 
 Pieni marssi (Small march), EM496 (1926)
 Prélude, EM498, G flat minor (1892)
 Prelude, EM499A (1912)
 Prelude, EM499B (1912)
 Prélude, EM500 (1912)
 Prelude, EM501 (1912)
 Prélude, EM502A (1913)
 Prélude, EM502B (1913)
 Prelude, EM503 (1919)
 Prélude nocturne, EM504 (1916)
 Presto, EM505 (1897)
 Prinsessen, EM506 (1896)
 Prinsesspolka, EM507 (1930-luku?)
 Prinssin tanssi (Prince's dance), EM508 (1929)
 Rannalla (On the shore), EM513 (?)
 Romance, EM519A (1894)
 Romans, EM519B (1909)
 Saksalainen laulu (German song), EM520 (?) - Tysk visa
 Scene Orientale, EM522 (1894)
 Scherzo, EM523, A major (1892)
 Scherzo, EM524, A major (1890-luku?)
 Scherzo, EM525 (1903)
 Scherzo, EM526 (1916)
 Scherzo, EM527 (1917)
 Die Silberprinzessin, EM532 (?)
 Sinivuokolle (To a liverwort), EM534 (1927)
 Den sista gången (For the last time), EM535 (1898)
 Den sista vaggvisan (The last lullaby), EM536 (1927)
 Skogsstämning (Forest mood), EM537 (1893)
 Slädfärd (Sleigh ride), EM538 (1932 or earlier, published 1932) - Bagateller – 10 lätta stycken för piano
 Snöfall (Snowing), EM539 (1932 or earlier, published 1932) - Bagateller – 10 lätta stycken för piano
 Soluppgång (Sunrise), EM540 (1900) - urut
 Som stjärnan uppå himmelen (Like a star in the sky), EM541 (1930 or earlier)
 Sonat, EM543 (1896)
 Sonatine, EM545, B major (1892)
 Sonatine, EM546, E major (?)
 Sonatine, EM547, G major (?)
 Stilla stund (A quiet moment), EM548 (1932 or earlier, published 1932) - Bagateller – 10 lätta stycken för piano
 Sua kiitän (I thank you), EM549 (1932)
 Suvivirsi (Summer hymn), EM553 (1930s?) – Sommarpsalm
 Tema semplia, EM555 (1900)
 Tillegnad, EM558 (1911)
 To Uger (Two weeks), EM559 (1928?) - Kaksi viikkoa – 14 smaa Klaverstykker for Børn
 Søndagstur - Söndagspromenad – Sunnuntaikävely
 Børnene gaar til skole - Lapset juoksevat kouluun
 Duet - Duetto
 Influenza - Influenssa
 Støj - Springlek – Hälinää
 Den fattige Drengs Vise - Den fattige gossens visa – Köyhän pojan laulu
 Afteno - Aftono – Iltarauha
 Morgensalme - Morgonpsalm – Aamuvirsi
 Arbejdet begynder - Työ alkaa
 Sang om Lapland - Visan om Lappland – Laulu Lapista
 Den moderløse Pige synger - Den moderlösa flickan sjunger – Äidittömän tytön laulu
 Motorn - Motoren – Moottori
 Vemod - Surumieli
 Arbejdet er gjort - Arbetet är gjort – Työ on tehty
 Traum durch die Dämmerung, EM560A (1906 or earlier, lost)
 Trio, EM560B (1908)
 Työlaulu (Working song), EM562 (1916)
 Under mandelträdet på Pincio (Under an almond tree on Pincio), EM565A (1900)
 Ungersk dans (Hungarian dance), EM565B (1893, lost)
 Vaggvisa (Lullaby), EM566 (1904)
 Valon poika (Son of Light), EM567 (?)
 Valse, EM568 (1925)
 Vandrare (Wanderer), EM569 (1898)
 Vid en källa, EM572 (1932 or earlier, published 1932) - Bagateller – 10 lätta stycken för piano
 Visa (A song), EM574 (1893)
 Die Wallfahrt der Binsgauer, EM577 (1890-luku)
 Der Zufriedene, EM580 (1901)
 Åkallan (Invocation), EM581 (1917)
 Österlandet (Orient), EM583 (1897)
 Österlandet (Orient), EM584 (?)
 10 pianokappaletta (Ten piano pieces), EM585 (1898?)

Works for piano four hands 
 Marionnettes, Op. 1 (1897) - Suite pour le piano à 4 mains - Piano for four hands
 Entrée des Marionnettes
 Pas des deux
 Sérénade
 Capriccio
 Duo Amoureux
 Cortège et Sortie des Marionnettes
 Festmarsch, EM047 (1898)
 Intermezzo, EM085 (1894)
 Intermezzo umoristico, EM391 (1897)
 Pastorale, EM486 (?)
 Suite mignon, EM550 (1897)

Works for 2 pianos 
 Fantasie für 2 Clavire, EM044 (1901)

Works for organ 
 Festliches Präludium, EM046 (1931?, published 1955 and 1984)
 Fuga, EM340 (1920)
 Fugato, EM343A (?)
 Intermezzo, EM384 (1890s)
 Organo, EM479 (1933)

Concertos 
 Concerto for violin and orchestra, Op. 60, D minor (1910-1913/1930, unpublished, recorded)
 Scéne dansante, EM210 (1930-luku?, unpublished, recorded) – Violoncello and chamber orchestra
 Pianokonserten (Piano concerto), EM493 (1901-1933) – Just fragments exist

Composition for a string instrument and piano 
All for violin and piano, unless otherwise stated.
 Viulusonaatti No. 1 (Violin sonata), Op. 10, E major (1899)
 Elegie, Op. 44, No. 1 (30.7.1907) – Violin or violoncello and piano
 Cantilene, Op. 44, No. 2 (6.11.1907) - Violin or violoncello and piano
 Canzone, Op. 44, No. 3 (1908)
 Berceuse, Op. 44, No. 4 (1901?)
 Romance, Op. 44, No. 5, F major (1901?)
 Nocturne, Op. 64, F major (1910)
 Viulusonaatti No. 2 (Violon sonata 2), Op. 74, D flat minor (1897/1933, unpublished, unfinished)
 7 pientä kappaletta (7 small pieces), Op. 82 (1914-1915?) - 7 små stycken - 7 pièces pour violon et piano
 Aamurukous - Morgonbön - Prière de matin - Morgen
 Yksin - Ensam - Solitude - Einsam
 Leikinlasku - Humoresk - Humoresque - Humoreske
 Kehtolaulu - Vaggvisa - Berceuse - Wiegenlied
 Ländler
 Tervehdys - Hälsning - Dédicace - Gruss
 Menuetto, G major
 5 pièces faciles, Op. 94 (1915-1916) 
 Intrada (unpublished)
 Arioso (lost or never composed)
 Piccola Gavotta (1916, published)
 Canzona (lost or never composed)
 Rondino (lost or never composed)
 Sex lätta stycken, Op. 121 (1924) - 6 helppoa kappaletta - 6 enkla stycken - Six Easy Pieces – Three different versions of each exist: violoncello and piano, violin and piano and violin, violoncello and piano
 Canto religioso
 Menuetto
 Berceuse
 Nocturne
 Serenata
 Mattinata
 Andante, EM015, A minor (1933)
 Berceuse, EM026, A major (1901? published 1901)
 Chanson, EM031 (1895)
 Concertino, EM032 (1923)
 Fantasia, EM043 (1897?) - Ballade – Fantasie
 Intermezzo, EM081 (1912, published 1993)
 Meditatio, EM154 (1929) – Violin and piano, violoncello ad. lib.
 Melodi, EM158 (1896?)
 Allegro maestoso, EM288 (1896)
 Lento, EM428 (1923)
 Notturno, EM475 (1924) – Violoncello and piano
 Sonat för piano och violoncello (Sonata for piano and violoncello), EM544 (1913) – Violoncello and piano
 Violinsonat (Sonata for violin), EM573, E major (1893) – sketches only

Compositions for a string quartet 
 Jousikvartetto No. 1 (String quartet No. 1), Op. 36, No. 1, E minor (1896, unpublished)
 Jousikvartetto No. 2 (String quartet No. 2), Op. 36, No. 2, G minor (1898-1900, unpublished)
 Jousikvartetto No. 3 (String quartet No. 3), Op. 36, No. 3, Es major (1902, unpublished)
 Jousikvartetto No. 4 (String quartet No. 4), Op. 62, F major (1908-1910, unpublished)
 Fuga, EM051, A major (?)
 Fuuga, EM053, G minor (?)
 Intermezzo, EM383 (1896)
 Stråkqvartett c-moll (String quartet C minor), EM398 (1898) – unfinished, material used in Symphony No. 1

Other chamber music 
 Jousitrio (String trio), Op. 133 (1926) – Violin, viola and violoncello
 Sonata per flauto ed arpa, Op. 135b (5.3.1931) – Flute and harp (arrangement of Op. 135a with an added Andante) – arrangement for flute and guitar by Timo Hongisto published
 Puhallinkvartetto (Brass quartet), Op. 153 (1929, unpublished) – 2 trumpets, horn and trombone
 Puhallintrio (Woodwind trio), Op. 154 (1929, unpublished) – Flute, clarinet and bassoon
 Pieni kvartetti neljälle cornille (A small quartet for four horns), Op. 185 (1936, unpublished, recorded) – 4 horns
 Kappale harpulle and huilulle (A piece for harp and flute), Op. 187 (1930s?, unpublished, lost)
 Meditatio, EM154 (1930s) - Violin, violoncello and piano
 Pianokvintetto (Piano quintet), EM186 (1897-1899) – 2 violins, viola, violoncello and piano
 Pianotrio, e-molli (Piano trio E minor), EM187 (1895-1896) - Violin, violoncello and piano
 Canon, EM318 (1907) - Violin, violoncello and piano
 Kammarsymfoni, EM403 (1923) – String quartet, flute, oboe, clarinet, bassoon and horn (only piano sketches exist)
 Musik für vier Instrumente, EM472 (1932) – Flute, violin, clarinet and violincello
 Pastorale, EM487 (1902) – Flute and piano
 Punapaula, EM509 (1920-luku?) - 2 trumpets, horn and trombone

Other musical works 
 Neljä fuugaa (Four fugues), Op. 189 (1936?, unpublished) – possibly for string quartet or string orchestra
 Aavistelija (Foresee), EM004 (1931, lost) – Melartin's suggestion for the break signal of the Finnish Broadcasting Company
 Pieniä kappaleita kanteleella (Small pieces with kantele), EM189 (1935)
 Kalevalainen laulu (Song from Kalevala)
 Häälaulu (Wedding song)
 Tyttö rannalla (Girl on the shore)
 Yksin (Alone)
 Rannalla itkijä (Crying on the shore)
 Lyydinen sarja (Lydic suite)
 Allegro, EM286 (1894) - Instrumental voice
 Andante pastorale, EM297A (1930) - Instrumental voice
 Barbarentanz, EM308 (1914) - Instrumental voice
 Canto funebre, EM319 (?) – Instrumental voice (basso)
 Gammal melodi, EM344 (?) – Instrumental voice and piano
 Humoresk, EM367 (1915) – Instrumental voice and piano
 Kontrapunkt, EM415A (?) – 40 pages of MS sketches for unspecified voices
 Kun illoin rukoilevat (Praying in the evening), EM417 (1927) - Instrumental voice
 Lumikorpien yö (Night in the snowy forest), EM440B (?) - Instrumental voice
 Menuetto all'antico, EM458 (1913) - Instrumental voice
 Muurahaiset (The ants), EM473 (?) - Instrumental voice
 På bryggan (On the bride), EM510 (1914) - Instrumental voice
 Tunnelma (Mood), EM561 (1931) – Instrumental voice

Arrangements of works by other composers 
Arrangements are listed here by the original composer. The several arrangements Melartin did of traditional and anonymous works are in the main list.

 Johann Sebastian Bach
 Ich halte treulich still, Op. 157, No. 1 (for piano. 1924) – BWV 466 of Die geistlichen Lieder und Arien (BWV 439-507)
 Am Abend, Op. 157, No. 2 (for piano. 1924) – BWV 448 of Die geistlichen Lieder und Arien (BWV 439-507)
 Freuet euch, ihr Christen alle, Op. 157, No. 3 (for piano. 1924) – Finale chorus from BWV 40 Darzu ist erschienen der Sohn Gottes
 Präludium, Op. 157, No. 4 (for piano. 1918) – The last prelude from Sonaten und Partiten, BWV1001-1006
 Leonhard Emil Bach
 Kein Hälmlein wächst auf Erden (for piano. 1924, unpublished)
Carl Michael Bellman
 Solen glimmar blank och trind, FE 48 (for mixed choir, in Finnish Kevätlaulu, unpublished)
 Ole Bull
 Sæterjentens søndag (for tenor and orchestra, unpublished) - Paimentytön sunnuntai
 Enrico De Leva
 Passero sperduto (voice and violin 1905 in Finnish by Jalmari Hahl, Eksynyt varpunen, unpublished)
 Henri Desmarets & Co.
 Pièces classiques, Op. 158 (for violin and piano. 1919 or earlier, published 1919)
 Passacaille – Charles-Hubert Gervais (Hypermnestre 1716)
 Gavotte en Rondeau - Jean-Baptiste Lully (Ballet de la Raillerie, LWV11, 1659)
 Tricotets – Louis Joseph Saint-Amans (Ninette à la Cour 1791)
 Menuet - Jean-Jacques Rousseau (Le Devin du Village 1748)
 Tamburin - André Ernest Modeste Grétry (Aspasie 1789)
 Sarabande et Passepied - André Cardinal Destouches (Issé 1693)
 Bourrée – Jean-Joseph Mouret (Les Amours de Ragonde 1742)
 Pavane et Gavotte - Jean-Baptiste Lully (La Noce de Village, LWV19, 1680 & Ballet de l'amour malade, LWV8, 1657)
 Rigaudons – Henri Desmarets (Circé 1694)
 Gigue - André Ernest Modeste Grétry (Denys le tyran 1794)
 Richard Faltin
 I lifvets kamp (for piano. 1901, published 1901)
 Giovanni Giacomo Gastoldi
 Il bell' umore (for piano. 1908, unpublished)
 Emil Genetz
 Ii-ii (for piano. 1901 or earlier, published 1901)
 Karjala (for piano. 1901 or earlier, published 1901)
Kreeta Haapasalo
 Kanteleeni (My kantele) (voice and piano. 1906?, published 1906)
 August Halm
 Tempo di minuetto (for violin, viola or second violin and violoncello, unpublished)
George Frideric Handel
 O theure Gattin (for voice and string orchestra, from Amadigi di Gaula, HWV 11, unpublished)
 Armas Järnefelt
 Onnelliset (The happy ones) (for piano. 1901 or earlier, published 1901)
 Sirkka (for piano. 1901 or earlier, published 1901)
 Heino Kaski
 Lähdettyäs (When you've gone), Op. 26, No. 3 (voice and chamber orchestra, unpublished)
 Toivo Kuula
 Aamulaulu (Morning song), Op. 2, No. 3 (for piano. 1928, published 1928)
 Taikapeili (The magic mirror), Op. 30c. No 4, Metsä-Matti soittaa (for piano. 1928, published 1928)
 Oskar Merikanto
 Kevätlinnuille etelässä (To the spring birds now in south), Op. 11, No. 1 (for piano. 1928, published 1928)
 Kottarainen (Starling), Op. 36, No. 2 (for piano. 1928, published 1928)
 Lohdutus (Consolation), Op. 42, No. 2 (for piano. 1901 or earlier, published 1901)
 Reppurin laulu (Backpacker's song), Op. 14, No. 10 (for voice and orchestra, 1930 or earlier, known only from recording)
 Vallinkorvan laulu (Song of Vallinkorva), Op. 24, No. 2 (for tenor and orchestra, unpublished)
 Wolfgang Amadeus Mozart
 Ave verum corpus, KV 618 (for string quartet, unpublished)
 Piano concerto No. 15, KV 450, B major (cadence 1896, unpublished)
 Gustaf Nordqvist
 Tala, älskade, tala (for voice and chamber orchestra, unpublished)
 Fredrik Pacius
 Maamme / Vårt land (for piano. 1929, published in Helmivyö I, Op. 159a)
 Suomis sång / Suomen laulu (for piano. 1929, published in Helmivyö II, Op. 159b)
 Bernardo Pasquini
 Giran pure in ciel le sfere (for voice and orchestra, unpublished)
 K. Ranuszewicz
 Menuetto all'antico (for violin and piano, unpublished)
 Franz Schubert
 Trois Marches Héroiques, D602. No 1 (for orchestra, unpublished)
 Jean Sibelius
 Sortunut ääni, Op. 18, No. 1 (for piano. 1901 or earlier, published 1901)
 Terve kuu, Op. 18, No. 2 (for piano. 1901 or earlier, published 1901)
 Venematka, Op. 18, No. 3 (for piano. 1901 or earlier, published 1901)
 Saarella palaa, Op. 18, No. 4 (for piano. 1901 or earlier, published 1901)
 Metsämiehen laulu, Op. 18, No. 5 (for piano. 1921 or earlier, published 1921)
 Sydämeni laulu, Op. 18, No. 6 (for piano. 1921 or earlier, published 1921)
 Jāzeps Vītols
 Piecas latviešu tautas dziesmas (for voice and piano, unpublished)
 Karl Wilhelm (conductor)
 Die Wacht am Rhein (for piano. 1901 or earlier, published 1901)
 Rafael Öhberg
 Kaksoisvirta (for mixed choir 1932, published 1932)

Literature 
 Poroila, Heikki: Erkki Melartinin teosluettelo - Erkki Melartin Werkverzeichnis - Erkki Melartin Work Catalog. Helsinki. Suomen musiikkikirjastoyhdistys. 2016.
 Poroila, Heikki: Erkki Melartinin teosluettelo 2.0 - Erkki Melartin Werkverzeichnis 2.0 - Erkki Melartin Work Catalog 2.0. Helsinki. Honkakirja. 2020. Updated PDF version

References 

Melartin, Erkki